= Inertia (disambiguation) =

Inertia is the resistance of a physical object to change in its velocity.

Inertia may also refer to:

== Science and engineering ==
- Climate inertia, a slowness of the Earth system to changes in significant factors such as greenhouse gas levels
- Ecological inertia, the ability of a living system to resist external fluctuations
- Thermal inertia, the resistance of an object or body to temperature change in response to heat input
- Sleep inertia, a physiological state
- Sylvester's law of inertia, a theorem in matrix algebra
- Inertial response, a property of electrical power grids

=== Mechanical engineering ===
- Moment of inertia, the resistance to angular acceleration
- Inertial mass, the amount of matter defined by its resistance to acceleration
- Second moment of area, a geometrical property of a body that determines its resistance to bending

== Social science ==
- Cognitive inertia, resistance to change in an individual's beliefs
- Psychological inertia, a tendency to favor omission over commission due to a lack of incentive to act
- Psychical inertia, a term introduced by Carl Jung
- Social inertia, description of a person's resistance to change in psychology and sociology
- Corporate inertia or unwillingness to change, a diseconomy of scale in microeconomics
- Industrial inertia, a situation where an industry stays at a location even after the conditions that drew it there no longer exist.

== Arts and entertainment ==
- Inertia (film), a 2001 Canadian drama
- Inertia (Marvel Comics), a fictional hero
- Inertia (DC Comics), a fictional antagonist
- "Inertia" (short story), a story by Nancy Kress

=== Music ===
- Inertia, an Irish DJ duo, the pairing of John O'Callaghan and Neal Scarborough
- Inertia (The Exies album), an album by The Exies
- Inertia (Derek Sherinian album), an album by Derek Sherinian
- Inertia (Pendulum album), an album by Pendulum
- Interia, an album by Grandson
- "Inertia" (song), by AJR from the album The Maybe Man
- "Inertia", a song by Alchemist from the album Spiritech
- "Inertia", a song by Blur from the album Leisure
- "Inertia", a song by Bruce Dickinson from the album Skunkworks
- "Inertia", a song by In Hearts Wake from the album Divination
- "Inertia", a song by Insomnium from the album One for Sorrow
- "Inertia", a song by The Wonder Stuff from the album Never Loved Elvis
- "Inertia", a song by 20syl
