= Omission bias =

Tendency to favor inaction over action

Omission bias is the moral judgement in which people prefer omission (inaction) over commission (action), and tend to believe harm as a result of commission more negatively than harm as a result of omission.

It works in three forms. First, when omissions and commissions have the same bad outcomes, people find the former more favorable. Secondly, within the same choice set, the bad actions are regarded as morally worse than the factually worse inactions. Thirdly, subjects often find omissions more acceptable, compared to actions that bring an equally favorable result but with positive and negative tradeoffs.

It can occur due to a number of processes, including psychological inertia, the perception of transaction costs, and the perception that commissions are more causal than omissions.

In social political terms the Universal Declaration of Human Rights establishes how basic human rights are to be assessed in article 2, as "without distinction of any kind, such as race, colour, sex, language, religion, political or other opinion, national or social origin, property, birth or other status." criteria that are often subject to one or another form of omission bias. It is controversial as to whether omission bias is a cognitive bias or is often rational. The bias is often showcased through the trolley problem and has also been described as an explanation for the endowment effect and status quo bias.

== Academic Evidence ==
Baron and Ritov (1990) reported the omission bias in the scenario of vaccination. Although the outcome of disease is even worse, participants were reluctant to vaccinate if it showed a bad outcome (a potential death caused by side effect). Specifically, the minimum death rate of disease that encouraged participants to vaccinate was approximately ten times more than the death rate of vaccination.

Spranca et al. further tested this phenomenon in scenarios including strategies for tennis tournament and trolley problem in 1991. Confronting the same negative outcomes, participants rated omissions as less bad than the corresponding commissions, while the deprecation of harmful actions was not accompanied with the same level of recommendation of the helpful ones. Overall, the negative part of active decisions is exaggerated, compared to that of omissions. Several studies have successfully replicated this finding.

Recent replication also suggested the temporal-spatial generalization of omission bias. Children aged 7-8 and 11-12 reported similar moral judgement with adults: considering a behavior to obtain a self-directed benefit, participants from different ages showed a similar preference to the omission and often regarded commission as morally worse one.Except Western population, East-Asian sample also largely shared the pattern of omission bias, though nuances existed: Chinese participants reported a stronger tendency to deprecate a harmful action compared to American, probably because of Chinese traditional concept of Taoism which encourages ‘wuwei’ (inaction).

== Mechanism ==
Norm theory and reference point. Kahneman and Miller pointed that people tended to regard omissions as a norm, a neutral reference point, and actions as an abnormal activity. This distinction stemmed from people's easier imagination of behaviors they didn't adapt (or the omission situation) than what they carried out. For the abnormal, they demonstrated more sensitive feelings, targeting the benefits that should be there and thus resulting in the amplification of the loss and foregone benefits from commissions.

Loss aversion. The comparison between omission and commission interacts with loss aversion, the principle that gains are weighed less heavily than losses of the same magnitude. Subjects perceived omissions as a normal situation. As a result, even if the outcomes of both actions and inactions are negative, the loss from omission can still be seen as a 'forgone gain', which is better than a pure loss; similarly, when the outcomes are all positive, the gain from omission turns to be a 'forgone loss', which is better than a pure gain. Therefore, inactions are always more acceptable than actions.

Heuristic of asymmetric attribution. Heuristic is considered to be another reason of omission bias. A biased belief states that, compared to omissions, actions are considered to be tighter involved in the causes of outcomes because, also, they are more abnormal, and abnormal events are more likely to be seen as causes. From the perspective of actors, this can be translated into a blame that actors need to be responsible for the negative outcomes of commissions. However, the drawbacks caused by choosing to do nothing is not seen as actors' responsibility.

This may root from an overgeneralization that the easy excuse of negative results caused by unintended omission (usually the absence of actors) also works to forgive the pitfalls of omission when no or a little evidence was left to prove whether actors have the choice to decide act or not to act. Therefore, when actors do not want to take charge of potential risks, omissions are largely favored. This explanation is believed to be irrational, because people fail to recognize the omissions that enact after decision-makers' consideration of the alternative as another kind of action (that is, act to do nothing), instead of the absence of actions.

== Examples and applications ==
Taoism may gnomically promote inaction: "If you follow the Way you shall do less each day. You shall do less and less until you do nothing at all. And if you do nothing at all, there is nothing that is left undone."

Spranca, Minsk and Baron extended the omission bias to judgments of morality of choices. In one scenario, John, a tennis player, would be facing a tough opponent the next day in a decisive match. John knows his opponent is allergic to a food substance. Subjects were presented with two conditions: John recommends the food containing the allergen to hurt his opponent's performance, or the opponent himself orders the allergenic food, and John says nothing. A majority of people judged that John's action of recommending the allergenic food as more immoral than John's inaction of not informing the opponent of the allergenic substance.

The effect has also held in real-world athletic arenas: NBA statistics showcased that referees called 50 percent fewer fouls in the final moments of close games.

An additional real-world example is when parents decide not to vaccinate their children because of the potential chance of death—even when the probability the vaccination will cause death is much less likely than death from the disease prevented.

== Criticism ==
Connolly and Reb (2011) failed to replicate omission bias in the scenario of vaccination. In their experiment, the majority of participants expressed willingness to vaccinate when facing the risk of side effect and they attributed such decisions to 'regret-avoiding choice' (action to avoid worse risks of inaction). Researchers reviewed Baron and Ritov's experiment in 1990 and criticized the fill-in-the-blank format and matching, measures of participants' acceptance of risky vaccination in previous experiments, for the cause of confusion and involvement extreme responses. Researchers, therefore, argued that the generalization of omission bias should be treated with caution.

Similar counterexamples are found in cross-cultural background. In the research of rural Mayan population, participants did not judge harmful commissions as worse than omissions. This is partly because of the distinct cultural belief that Mayan regards negative outcome as a step to greater good instead of an avoidable side effect.

Furthermore, even in the Western population, omission bias is argued to become a contextual phenomenon, especially when considering the converse example of action bias. Action bias is a preference of commission even when omission produces more benefit. According to Patt et al. (2000), omission bias and action bias can be seen as dichotomy of dual outcomes: omission bias works when outcome is negative, and action bias works when it is positive. Derived from norm theory, the normality reversed from omission to commission when the expected outcome change, thus resulting in the contradictory decisions. Because of this underlying rational reason, Descrioli et al. further described the preference of omission as a strategy, instead of a bias.

== See also ==
- List of cognitive biases
- Psychological inertia
- Lying by omission
- Sin of omission
- Status quo bias
- Endowment effect
- Trolley problem
- "All that is necessary for the triumph of evil is for good men to do nothing" for contrast
- Action bias for the opposite
