= Inertia (comics) =

Inertia, in comics, may refer to:

- Inertia (Marvel Comics), Edith Freiberg, a lesbian Army private
- Inertia (DC Comics), Thaddeus Thawne, a supervillainous clone of Bart Allen

== See also ==
- Inertia (disambiguation)
