= Cognitive inertia =

Lack of motivation to mentally tackle a problem or issue

Cognitive inertia is the tendency – for a particular orientation in an individual's thinking about a matter, belief, or strategy – to resist change. Clinical and neuroscientific literature often describes it as a lack of motivation to generate cognitive processes needed to attend to a matter or problem.

The physics term "inertia" emphasizes resistance to change in a mode of cognitive processing that has been used for a substantial time. Commonly confused with belief perseverance, cognitive inertia is perseverance in an interpretation of information, not perseverance in the belief itself.

Cognitive inertia has been causally implicated in disregard of impending threats to one's health or environment, in enduring political values, and in deficits in task switching. Interest in the phenomenon was taken up by economic and industrial psychologists primarily to explain resistance to change in brand loyalty, in group brainstorming, and in business strategizing.

In a clinical setting, cognitive inertia has been used as a diagnostic tool for neurodegenerative diseases, depression, and anxiety.

Critics have commented that the term "cognitive inertia" oversimplifies resistant thought processes and suggest a more integrative approach involving motivation, emotion, and developmental factors.

== History and methods ==
=== Early history ===
The idea of cognitive inertia has its roots in philosophical epistemology. Early allusions to a reduction of cognitive inertia can be found in the Socratic dialogues written by Plato. Socrates builds his argument by using the detractor's beliefs as the premise of his argument's conclusions. In doing so, Socrates reveals the detractor's fallacy of thought, inducing the detractor to change their mind or face the reality that their thought processes are contradictory. Ways to combat persistence of cognitive style are also seen in Aristotle's syllogistic method which employs logical consistency of the premises to convince an individual of the conclusion's validity.

At the beginning of the twentieth century, two of the earliest experimental psychologists, Müller and Pilzecker, defined perseveration of thought to be "the tendency of ideas, after once having entered consciousness, to rise freely again in consciousness". Müller described perseveration by illustrating his own inability to inhibit old cognitive strategies with a syllable-switching task, while his wife easily switched from one strategy to the next. One of the earliest personality researchers, W. Lankes, more broadly defined perseveration as "being confined to the cognitive side" and possibly "counteracted by strong will". These early ideas of perseveration were the precursor to how the term cognitive inertia would be used to study certain symptoms in patients with neurodegenerative disorders, rumination and depression.

=== Cognitive psychology ===
Originally proposed by William J. McGuire in 1960, the theory of cognitive inertia was built upon emergent theories in social psychology and cognitive psychology that centered around cognitive consistency, including Fritz Heider's balance theory and Leon Festinger's cognitive dissonance. McGuire used the term cognitive inertia to account for an initial resistance to change how an idea was processed after new information, that conflicted with the idea, had been acquired.

In McGuire's initial study involving cognitive inertia, participants gave their opinions of how probable they believed various topics to be. A week later, they returned to read messages related to the topics they had given their opinions on. The messages were presented as factual and were targeted to change the participants' belief in how probable the topics were. Immediately after reading the messages, and one week later, the participants were again assessed on how probable they believed the topics to be. Discomforted by the inconsistency of the related information from the messages and their initial ratings on the topics, McGuire believed the participants would be motivated to shift their probability ratings to be more consistent with the factual messages. However, the participants' opinions did not immediately shift toward the information presented in the messages. Instead, a shift towards consistency of thought on the information from the messages and topics grew stronger as time passed, often referred to as "seepage" of information. The lack of change was reasoned to be due to persistence in the individual's existing thought processes which inhibited their ability to re-evaluate their initial opinion properly, or as McGuire called it, cognitive inertia.

==== Probabilistic model ====
Although cognitive inertia was related to many of the consistency theories at the time of its conception, McGuire used a unique method of probability theory and logic to support his hypotheses on change and persistence in cognition. Utilizing a syllogistic framework, McGuire proposed that if three issues (a, b and c) were so interrelated that an individual's opinion were in complete support of issues a and b then it would follow their opinion on issue c would be supported as a logical conclusion. Furthermore, McGuire proposed if an individual's belief in the probability (p) of the supporting issues (a or b) was changed, then not only would the issue (c) explicitly stated change, but a related implicit issue (d) could be changed as well. More formally:

the required change ($\Delta$) on c necessary for maintaining logical consistency among the opinions is

$\Delta$p(c) = $\Delta$p(a & b)

which, assuming that a and b are independent events i.e., that p(a & b) = p(a) p(b) becomes

$\Delta$p(c) = $\Delta$p(a) p(b) + $\Delta$p(b) p(a) + $\Delta$p(a) $\Delta$p(b)

where p(a) and p(b) refer to the initial opinions, before the communication induced changes.

This formula was used by McGuire to show that the effect of a persuasive message on a related, but unmentioned, topic (d) took time to sink in. The assumption was that topic d was predicated on issues a and b, similar to issue c, so if the individual agreed with issue c then so too should they agree with issue d. However, in McGuire's initial study immediate measurement on issue d, after agreement on issues a, b and c, had only shifted half the amount that would be expected to be logically consistent. Follow-up a week later showed that shift in opinion on issue d had shifted enough to be logically consistent with issues a, b, and c, which not only supported the theory of cognitive consistency, but also the initial hurdle of cognitive inertia.

The model was based on probability to account for the idea that individuals do not necessarily assume every issue is 100% likely to happen, but instead there is a likelihood of an issue occurring and the individual's opinion on that likelihood will rest on the likelihood of other interrelated issues.

== Examples ==
=== Public health ===
==== Historical ====
Group (cognitive) inertia, how a subset of individuals view and process an issue, can have detrimental effects on how emergent and existing issues are handled. In an effort to describe the almost lackadaisical attitude from a large majority of U.S. citizens toward the insurgence of the Spanish flu in 1918, historian Tom Dicke has proposed that cognitive inertia explains why many individuals did not take the flu seriously. At the time, most U.S. citizens were familiar with the seasonal flu. They viewed it as an irritation that was often easy to treat, infected few, and passed quickly with few complications and hardly ever a death. However, this way of thinking about the flu was detrimental to the need for preparation, prevention, and treatment of the Spanish flu due to its quick spread and virulent form until it was much too late, and it became one of the most deadly pandemics in history.

==== Contemporary ====
In the more modern period, there is an emerging position that anthropogenic climate change denial is a kind of cognitive inertia. Despite the evidence provided by scientific discovery, there are still those – including nations – who deny its incidence in favor of existing patterns of development.

=== Geography ===
To better understand how individuals store and integrate new knowledge with existing knowledge, Friedman and Brown tested participants on where they believed countries and cities to be located latitudinally and then, after giving them the correct information, tested them again on different cities and countries. The majority of participants were able to use the correct information to update their cognitive understanding of geographical locations and place the new locations closer to their correct latitudinal location, which supported the idea that new knowledge affects not only the direct information but also related information. However, there was a small effect of cognitive inertia as some areas were unaffected by the correct information, which the researchers suggested was due to a lack of knowledge linkage in the correct information and new locations presented.

=== Group membership ===
==== Politics ====
The persistence of political group membership and ideology is suggested to be due to the inertia of how the individual has perceived the grouping of ideas over time. The individual may accept that something counter to their perspective is true, but it may not be enough to tip the balance of how they process the entirety of the subject.

Governmental organizations can often be resistant or glacially slow to change along with social and technological transformation. Even when evidence of malfunction is clear, institutional inertia can persist. Political scientist Francis Fukuyama has asserted that humans imbue intrinsic value on the rules they enact and follow, especially in the larger societal institutions that create order and stability. Despite rapid social change and increasing institutional problems, the value placed on an institution and its rules can mask how well an institution is functioning as well as how that institution could be improved. The inability to change an institutional mindset is supported by the theory of punctuated equilibrium, long periods of deleterious governmental policies punctuated by moments of civil unrest.

After decades of economic decline, the United Kingdom's referendum to leave the EU was seen as an example of the dramatic movement after a long period of governmental inertia. Conversely, after 10 years of Brexit, the UK population reversed its opinion of the decision, with 57% thinking it was a mistake and 55% wanting to rejoin.

==== Interpersonal roles ====
The unwavering views of the roles people play in our lives have been suggested as a form of cognitive inertia. When asked how they would feel about a classmate marrying their mother or father, many students said they could not view their classmate as a step-father/mother. Some students went so far as to say that the hypothetical relationship felt like incest.

Role inertia has also been implicated in marriage and the likelihood of divorce. Research on couples who cohabit together before marriage shows they are more likely to get divorced than those who do not. The effect is most seen in a subset of couples who cohabit without first being transparent about future expectations of marriage. Over time, cognitive role inertia takes over, and the couple marries without fully processing the decision, often with one or both of the partners not fully committed to the idea. The lack of deliberative processing of existing problems and levels of commitment in the relationship can lead to increased stress, arguments, dissatisfaction, and divorce.

== In business ==
Cognitive inertia is regularly referenced in business and management to refer to consumers' continued use of products, a lack of novel ideas in group brainstorming sessions, and lack of change in competitive strategies.

=== Brand loyalty ===
Gaining and retaining new customers is essential to whether a business succeeds early on. To assess a service, product, or likelihood of customer retention, many companies will invite their customers to complete satisfaction surveys immediately after purchasing a product or service. However, unless the satisfaction survey is completed immediately after the point of purchase, the customer response is often based on an existing mindset about the company, not the actual quality of experience. Unless the product or service is extremely negative or positive, cognitive inertia related to how the customer feels about the company will not be inhibited, even when the product or service is substandard. These satisfaction surveys can lack the information businesses need to improve a service or product that will allow them to survive against the competition.

=== Brainstorming ===
Cognitive inertia plays a role in why a lack of ideas is generated during group brainstorming sessions. Individuals in a group will often follow an idea trajectory, in which they continue to narrow in on ideas based on the very first idea proposed in the brainstorming session. This idea trajectory inhibits the creation of new ideas central to the group's initial formation.

In an effort to combat cognitive inertia in group brainstorming, researchers had business students either use a single-dialogue or multiple-dialogue approach to brainstorming. In the single dialogue version, the business students all listed their ideas. They created a dialogue around the list, whereas, in the multi-dialogue version, ideas were placed in subgroups that individuals could choose to enter and talk about and then freely move to another subgroup. The multi-dialogue approach was able to combat cognitive inertia by allowing different ideas to be generated in sub-groups simultaneously and each time an individual switched to a different sub-group, they had to change how they were processing the ideas, which led to more novel and high-quality ideas.

=== Competitive strategies ===
Adapting cognitive strategies to changing business climates is often integral to whether or not a business succeeds or fails during economic stress. In the late 1980s in the UK, real estate agents' cognitive competitive strategies did not shift with signs of an increasingly depressed real estate market, despite their ability to acknowledge the signs of decline. This cognitive inertia at the individual and corporate level has been proposed as reasons to why companies do not adopt new strategies to combat the ever-increasing decline in the business or take advantage of the potential. General Mills' continued operation of mills long after they were no longer necessary is an example of when companies refuse to change the mindset of how they should operate.

More famously, cognitive inertia in upper management at Polaroid was proposed as one of the main contributing factors to the company's outdated competitive strategy. Management strongly held that consumers wanted high-quality physical copies of their photos, where the company would make their money. Despite Polaroid's extensive research and development into the digital market, their inability to refocus their strategy to hardware sales instead of film eventually led to their collapse.

Scenario planning has been one suggestion to combat cognitive inertia when making strategic decisions to improve business. Individuals develop different strategies and outline how the scenario could play out, considering different ways it could go. Scenario planning allows for diverse ideas to be heard and the breadth of each scenario, which can help combat relying on existing methods and thinking alternatives is unrealistic.

=== Management ===
In a recent review of company archetypes that lead to corporate failure, Habersang, Küberling, Reihlen, and Seckler defined "the laggard" as one who rests on the laurels of the company, believing past success and recognition will shield them from failure. Instead of adapting to changes in the market, "the laggard" assumes that the same strategies that won the company success in the past will do the same in the future. This lag in changing how they think about the company can lead to rigidity in company identity, like Polaroid, conflict in adapting when the sales plummet, and resource rigidity. In the case of Kodak, instead of reallocating money to a new product or service strategy, they cut production costs and imitation of competitors, both leading to poorer quality products and eventually bankruptcy.

A review of 27 firms integrating the use of big data analytics found cognitive inertia to hamper the widespread implementation, with managers from sectors that did not focus on digital technology seeing the change as unnecessary and cost prohibitive.

Managers with high cognitive flexibility that can change the type of cognitive processing based on the situation at hand are often the most successful in solving novel problems and keeping up with changing circumstances. Interestingly, shifts in mental models (disrupting cognitive inertia) during a company crisis are frequently at the lower group level, with leaders coming to a consensus with the rest of the workforce in how to process and deal with the crisis, instead of vice versa. It is proposed that leaders can be blinded by their authority and too easily disregard those at the front-line of the problem causing them to reject remunerative ideas.

== Applications ==
=== Therapy ===
An inability to change how one thinks about a situation has been implicated as one of the causes of depression. Rumination, or the perseverance of negative thoughts, is often correlated with the severity of depression and anxiety. Individuals with high levels of rumination test low on scales of cognitive flexibility and have trouble shifting how they think about a problem or issue even when presented with facts that counter their thinking process.

In a review paper that outlined strategies that are effective for combating depression, the Socratic method was suggested to overcome cognitive inertia. By presenting the patient's incoherent beliefs close together and evaluating with the patient their thought processes behind those beliefs, the therapist is able to help them understand things from a different perspective.

=== Clinical diagnostics ===
In nosological literature relating to the symptom or disorder of apathy, clinicians have used cognitive inertia as one of the three main criteria for diagnosis. The description of cognitive inertia differs from its use in cognitive and industrial psychology in that lack of motivation plays a key role. As a clinical diagnostic criterion, Thant and Yager described it as "impaired abilities to elaborate and sustain goals and plans of actions, to shift mental sets, and to use working memory". This definition of apathy is frequently applied to onset of apathy due to neurodegenerative disorders such as Alzheimer's and Parkinson's disease but has also been applied to individuals who have gone through extreme trauma or abuse.

== Neural anatomy and correlates ==
=== Cortical ===
Cognitive inertia has been linked to decreased use of executive function, primarily in the prefrontal cortex, which aids in the flexibility of cognitive processes when switching tasks. Delayed response on the implicit associations task (IAT) and Stroop task have been related to an inability to combat cognitive inertia, as participants struggle to switch from one cognitive rule to the next to get the questions right.

Before taking part in an electronic brainstorming session, participants were primed with pictures that motivated achievement to combat cognitive inertia. In the achievement-primed condition, subjects were able to produce more novel, high-quality ideas. They used more right frontal cortical areas related to decision-making and creativity.

Cognitive inertia is a critical dimension of clinical apathy, described as a lack of motivation to elaborate plans for goal-directed behavior or automated processing. Parkinson's patients whose apathy was measured using the cognitive inertia dimension showed less executive function control than Parkinson's patients without apathy, possibly suggesting more damage to the frontal cortex. Additionally, more damage to the basal ganglia in Parkinson's, Huntington's and other neurodegenerative disorders have been found with patients exhibiting cognitive inertia in relation to apathy when compared to those who do not exhibit apathy. Patients with lesions to the dorsolateral prefrontal cortex have shown reduced motivation to change cognitive strategies and how they view situations, similar to individuals who experience apathy and cognitive inertia after severe or long-term trauma.

=== Functional connectivity ===
Nursing home patients who have dementia have been found to have larger reductions in functional brain connectivity, primarily in the corpus callosum, important for communication between hemispheres. Cognitive inertia in neurodegenerative patients has also been associated with a decrease in the connection of the dorsolateral prefrontal cortex and posterior parietal area with subcortical areas, including the anterior cingulate cortex and basal ganglia. Both findings are suggested to decrease motivation to change one's thought processes or create new goal-directed behavior.

== Alternative theories ==
Some researchers have refuted the cognitive perspective of cognitive inertia and suggest a more holistic approach that considers the motivations, emotions, and attitudes that fortify the existing frame of reference.

=== Alternative paradigms ===
==== Motivated reasoning ====
The theory of motivated reasoning is proposed to be driven by the individual's motivation to think a certain way, often to avoid thinking negatively about oneself. The individual's own cognitive and emotional biases are commonly used to justify a thought, belief, or behavior. Unlike cognitive inertia, where an individual's orientation in processing information remains unchanged either due to new information not being fully absorbed or being blocked by a cognitive bias, motivated reasoning may change the orientation or keep it the same depending on whether that orientation benefits the individual.

In an extensive online study, participant opinions were acquired after two readings about various political issues to assess the role of cognitive inertia. The participants gave their opinions after the first reading and were then assigned a second reading with new information; after being assigned to read more information on the issue that either confirmed or disconfirmed their initial opinion, the majority of participants' opinions did not change. When asked about the information in the second reading, those who did not change their opinion evaluated the information that supported their initial opinion as stronger than information that disconfirmed their initial opinion. The persistence in how the participants viewed the incoming information was based on their motivation to be correct in their initial opinion, not the persistence of an existing cognitive perspective.

==== Socio-cognitive inflexibility ====
From a social psychology perspective, individuals continually shape beliefs and attitudes about the world based on interaction with others. What information the individual attends to is based on prior experience and knowledge of the world. Cognitive inertia is seen not just as a malfunction in updating how information is being processed but as the assumptions about the world and how it works can impede cognitive flexibility. The persistence of the idea of the nuclear family has been proposed as a socio-cognitive inertia. Despite the changing trends in family structure, including multi-generational, single-parent, blended, and same-sex parent families, the normative idea of a family has centered around the mid-twentieth century idea of a nuclear family (i.e., mother, father, and children). Various social influences are proposed to maintain the inertia of this viewpoint, including media portrayals, the persistence of working-class gender roles, unchanged domestic roles despite working mothers, and familial pressure to conform.

The phenomenon of cognitive inertia in brainstorming groups has been argued to be due to other psychological effects such as fear of disagreeing with an authority figure in the group, fear of new ideas being rejected and the majority of speech being attributed to the minority group members. Internet-based brainstorming groups have been found to produce more ideas of high-quality because it overcomes the problem of speaking up and fear of idea rejection.

== See also ==
- Antiprocess
- Belief perseverance
- Cognitive bias
- Cognitive dissonance
- Cognitive distortion
- Conservatism (belief revision)
- Einstellung effect
- Industrial Psychology
- Inoculation theory
- Knowledge inertia
- Motivated reasoning
- Plan continuation bias
- Psychological inertia
- Rationalization (psychology)
- Rigidity (psychology)
- Status quo bias
- True-believer syndrome
