= Knowledge inertia =

Knowledge management concept

Knowledge inertia (KI) is a concept in knowledge management. The term initially proposed by Shu-hsien Liao comprises a two dimensional model which incorporates experience inertia and learning inertia. Later, another dimension—the dimension of thinking inertia—has been added based on the theoretical exploration of the existing concepts of experience inertia and learning inertia.

One of the central problems in knowledge management related to organizational learning is to deal with "inertia". Besides, individuals may also exhibit a natural tendency of inertia when facing problems during utilization of knowledge. Inertia in technical jargon means inactivity or torpor. Inertia in organizational learning context may be referred to as a slowdown in organizational learning-related activities. In fact, there are many other kinds of organizational inertia: e.g., innovation inertia, workforce inertia, productivity inertia, decision inertia, emotional inertia besides others that have different meanings in their own individual contexts. Some organization theorists have adopted the definition proposed by Liao (2002) to extend its further use in organizational learning studies.

== Definition ==
Knowledge inertia (KI) may be defined as a problem solving strategy using old, redundant, stagnant knowledge and past experience without recourse to new knowledge and experience. Inertia is a concept in physics that is used to explain the state of an object either remaining in stationary or uniform motion. Organizational theorists adopted this concept of inertia and applied it to different contexts which resulted in the emergence of diverse concepts—such as, for example, organizational inertia, consumer inertia, outsourcing inertia, and cognitive inertia. Some organization theorists have adopted the definition proposed by Liao (2002) to extend its further use in organizational learning studies. Not every instances of knowledge inertia result in gloomy of negative outcome: one study suggested that knowledge inertia could positively affect a firm's product innovation.

== The concept ==
Knowledge inertia stems from the use of routine problem solving procedures that involves the utilization of redundant, stagnant knowledge and past experience without any recourse to new knowledge and thinking processes. Different methodologies exist for diverse types of knowledge that could be applied to manage knowledge efficiently. Since KI is a component of knowledge management, it is essential to consider the circulation of various knowledge types in avoiding inertia. The theory of KI supposedly studies the extent to which an organization's ability on problem solving is inhibited. Numerous factors could be attributed as enablers or inhibitors of the abilities on problem solving of an individual or an organization. Knowledge inertia applicable in the context of problem solving, therefore, may require inputs from all these diverse knowledge types, or it may require learning, new thinking, and experience. Emergence of new ideas to supplement the existing knowledge and assimilation of the same could be of help in avoiding the use of stagnant, outdated information while attempting to solve problems.

== See also ==
- Cognitive inertia
- Neurathian bootstrap
- Psychological inertia
