= Social inertia =

Resistance to social change

In psychology and sociology, social inertia or cultural inertia is the resistance to change or the permanence of stable relationships possibly outdated in societies or social groups. Social inertia is the opposite of social change.

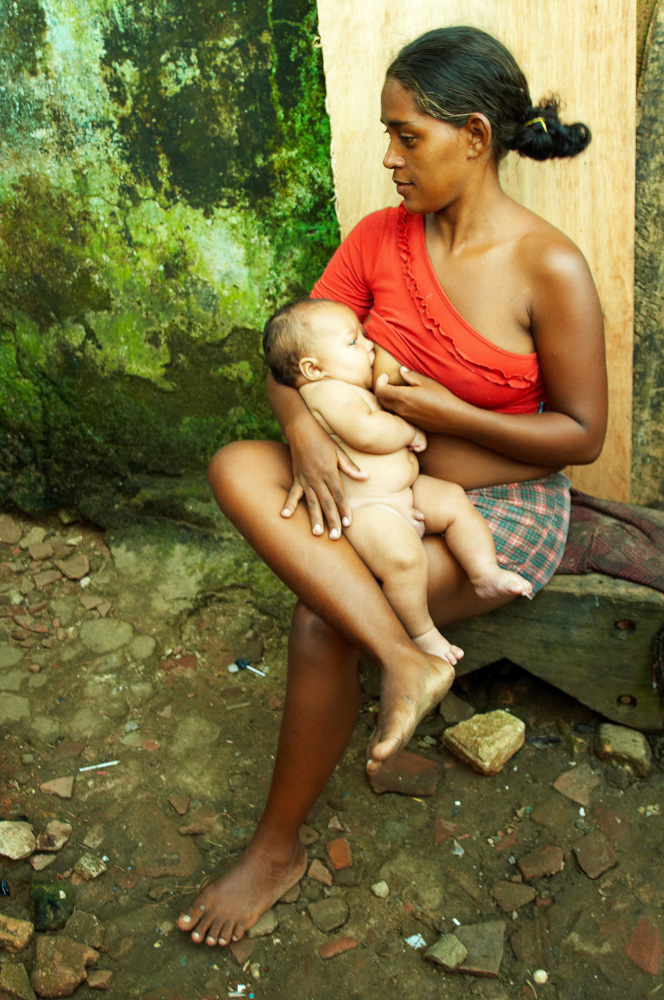
Woman with a culture of breastfeeding without covering the breast

== Overview ==
The idea of social inertia can be traced back to French sociologist Pierre Bourdieu. According to Bourdieu, each person occupies a position in a social space, which consists of his or her social class as well as social relationships and social networks. Through the individual's engagement in the social space, he or she develops a set of behaviors, lifestyle and habits (which Bourdieu referred to as habitus) which often serve to maintain the status quo. Thus, people are encouraged to "accept the social world as it is, to take it for granted, rather than to rebel against it, to counterpose to it different, even antagonistic, possibles." This can explain the continuity of the social order through time.

Sociologists have examined how economic and cultural heritage is transmitted across generations, which can lead to strong social inertia even during times of social progress. In particular, Bourdieu found in his studies of Algeria that even during times of rapid economic change, cultural and symbolic factors limited the flexibility of the society to quickly adapt to change.

Therefore, social inertia has been used to explain how dominant social classes maintain their status and privilege over time. Currently, this is a hotly debated topic in the United States. While President Barack Obama reaffirmed America's commitment to equal opportunity in his second inaugural address, Nobel laureate Joseph E. Stiglitz believes it is a myth that modern society offers equal opportunity and high social mobility through mechanisms such as formal education.

== Examples ==
=== In the culture of honor ===
An example of social inertia in the culture of the United States is the culture of honor which exists in parts of the South and West. In the culture of honor, violence is seen as an acceptable way of responding to insults or threats to a person's self, family, property, or reputation. Some psychologists and historians believe that the culture of honor arose as a way of enforcing order on the frontier, when the South and West were first being settled and there was inadequate law enforcement and little social order. According to this hypothesis, herding (which is a solitary activity) should be more closely tied to the culture of honor than farming (which is a cooperative activity). However, some scholars have not found support for this. When researchers examined the relationship between agricultural practices in the rural South and the white male homicide rates in those areas, they did not find that homicide rates were higher in counties that were hilly and arid and therefore more suitable for herding vs. farming. They concluded that homicide rates did not support the herding vs. farming hypothesis for the culture of honor. Therefore, religion and poverty have been offered as alternative explanations for the origins of the culture of honor.

Even though the economic and social circumstances of the South and West have since changed, the culture of honor persists due to social inertia. It has become a social norm in southern and western culture, and these norms persist even when economies change.

=== In creative labor ===
In a 2013 journal article in the Journal of Sociology, sociologist Scott Brook applied the theory of social inertia to the field of creative labor. Specifically, Brook was concerned with why so many students would continue to seek degrees in creative fields (such as the arts and creative writing), even when the oversupply of labor meant that many students were unable to find employment in those fields after graduation. Even if they were able to find employment, they earned less than their peers with non-creative degrees. Scott used Bourdieu's notion of social inertia to suggest that students who were drawn to the non-commercial nature of creative fields came from families with low socioeconomic status and whose parents had not been able to develop a career themselves. Students followed in their parents' footsteps by choosing educational pursuits which were less likely to lead to high-earning careers, thus leading to social inertia in income across generations.

=== In collaborations ===
Social inertia has been used as a way of studying collaborations and interactions between people. Specifically, social inertia has been defined as a measurement of how likely people are to continue collaborating with previous partners or members of the same team. An analysis of large-scale, complex networks such as the IMDb showed that two types of "extreme" collaboration behaviors appeared more than average – some people collaborate with the same partners over and over again, while others change partners frequently.

=== In attitudes and attitude change ===
Psychological studies on attitudes and attitude change have found that participants are reluctant to reduce their confidence in an estimate that they have made even after they receive new information that goes against their original estimate. Researchers have hypothesized that this "inertia effect" is due to participants' psychological commitment to their initial judgments.

=== In romantic relationships ===
Some psychological studies have shown that premarital cohabitation (living together before marriage) is associated with an increased risk of divorce, and this has been termed the cohabitation effect. Researchers believe that one reason for this effect is that living together increases the inertia of the relationship – i.e. the likelihood that a couple will continue to stay together vs. break up. Inertia in cohabiting couples occurs because living together imposes constraints on a relationship (a shared lease, etc.) that make relationships harder to end. Therefore, a cohabiting couple may stay together even if they are not compatible. Because living together represents an ambiguous form of commitment compared with marriage, cohabiting may not increase the levels of dedication in either partner. Partners may "slide" into marriage through cohabitation instead of making a firm decision to commit to each other, leading to problems in the marriage in the future.

However, the research on whether higher divorce rates are due to the cohabitation effect are mixed. For example, researchers have found that the relationship between cohabitation and divorce also depends on factors such as when the couple was married (for example, marriages which take place after 1996 do not show the cohabitation effect), their race/ethnicity, and their marriage plans at the time of cohabitation. Other studies have found that what has been called the cohabitation effect is entirely attributable to other factors.

=== In animal behavior ===
The term social inertia was used by A.M. Guhl in 1968 to describe dominance hierarchies in animal groups. Studies of animal behavior have found that groups of animals can form social orders or social hierarchies that are relatively fixed and stable. For example, chickens establish a social order within the group based on pecking behaviors. Even when some of the chickens were treated with an androgen to increase their aggressiveness, the established social order suppressed their exhibition of aggressive behaviors so that social order was maintained.

This same effect has been found in other birds as well as in invertebrates such as social wasps and the burying beetle N. orbicollis. Researchers theorize that this lack of change in social hierarchies even under the influence of aggression hormones is due to the effects of familiarity – animals learn their place in the social hierarchy of a group within the first few encounters with other group members. This will cause low-ranking animals treated with aggression hormones to behave aggressively towards animals from other groups but not towards dominant members of their own group.

== Related concepts ==
=== Cultural inertia ===
The psychologist Michael Zarate has coined the term "cultural inertia" to refer to reactions to social change, such as those caused by immigration. Cultural inertia is defined as the desire to avoid cultural change, and also the desire for change to continue once it is already occurring. Within the cultural inertia framework, the dominant group is stable and resists cultural change, while subordinate groups desire cultural changes which incorporate their cultural traditions so that they don't have to assimilate into the dominant culture. In the context of the United States and immigration, the framework suggests that white majority members resist the cultural change that occurs from immigration, while immigrant groups try to enact change in U.S. culture.

Cultural inertia is related to social psychological theories such as the instrumental model of group conflict, acculturative fit, and system justification theory. It is a contributor to intergroup prejudice due to groups' fear of cultural change.

== See also ==
- Norm (social)
- Psychological inertia
- Social conservatism
- Status quo bias
- System justification
