= Set (psychology) =

Group of expectations in psychology

In psychology, a set is a group of expectations that shape experience by making people especially sensitive to specific kinds of information. A perceptual set, also called perceptual expectancy, is a predisposition to perceive things in a certain way. Perceptual sets occur in all the different senses. They can be long term, such as a special sensitivity to hearing one's own name in a crowded room, or short term, as in the ease with which hungry people notice the smell of food. A mental set is a framework for thinking about a problem. It can be shaped by habit or by desire. Mental sets can make it easy to solve a class of problem, but attachment to the wrong mental set can inhibit problem-solving and creativity.

== Perceptual ==
Perception can be shaped by "top-down" processes such as drives and expectations. An effect of these factors is that people are particularly sensitive to perceive certain things, detecting them from weaker stimuli than otherwise. A simple demonstration of the effect involved very brief presentations of non-words such as "sael". Subjects who were told to expect words about animals read it as "seal", but others who were expecting boat-related words read it as "sail".

Sets can be created by motivation and so can result in people interpreting ambiguous situations so that they see what they want to see. For instance, a person's experience of the events in a sports match can be biased if they strongly support one of the teams. In one experiment, students were allocated to pleasant or unpleasant tasks by a computer. They were told that either a number or a letter would flash on the screen to say whether they were going to taste an orange juice drink or an unpleasant-tasting health drink. In fact, an ambiguous figure was flashed on screen, which could either be read as the letter B or the number 13. When the letters were associated with the pleasant task, subjects were more likely to perceive a letter B, and when letters were associated with the unpleasant task they tended to perceive a number 13.

Perceptual sets have been demonstrated in many social contexts. People who are primed to think of someone as "warm" are more likely to perceive a variety of positive characteristics in them, than if the word "warm" is replaced by "cold". When someone has a reputation for being funny, an audience are more likely to find them amusing. Individual's perceptual sets reflect their own personality traits. For example, people with an aggressive personality are quicker to correctly identify aggressive words or situations.

== Mental ==
Mental sets are subconscious tendencies to approach a problem in a particular way, either helping or interfering in the discovery of a solution. They are shaped by past experiences, habits, and, most importantly, culture. These sets also exist as parts of our cognitive processes although they do not always enter consciousness. This is demonstrated in the way bookkeepers can balance their book without being aware of using addition or subtraction. An inappropriate mental set hampers the solution of straightforward problems. This could happen if the set contains a false assumption or a belief that is not correct. For example, when people are asked, "When a United States plane carrying Canadian passengers crashes in international waters, where should the survivors be buried?" the phrasing of the question suggests that it is a problem of international law. People who interpret the statement with this mental set will miss the fact that survivors would not need to be buried. A specific form of mental set is functional fixedness, in which someone fails to see the variety of uses to which an object can be put. An example would be someone who needs a weight but fails to use an easily available hammer because their mental set is to think of a hammer as for a specific purpose.

== See also ==
- Basic beliefs
- Mental model
- Mental representation
- Paradigm
- Rigidity (psychology)
- Schema (psychology)
- Worldview
