= David Gal =

American marketing professor

David Gal is Professor of Marketing at the University of Illinois Chicago. He is best known for his critique of the behavioral economics concept of loss aversion.

== Academic career ==
Gal received his Ph.D. from Stanford University in 2007. He joined the faculty of The Kellogg School of Management at Northwestern University where he remained until 2014, at which time he joined the faculty of The University of Illinois at Chicago.

His research has been published in Journal of Consumer Research, Journal of Marketing Research, Journal of Marketing, Judgment and Decision Making, Psychological Science, Management Science, and Journal of the American Statistical Association. It has been featured in the New York Times, Wall Street Journal, The Toronto Star, Time, Harvard Business Review, and The Globe and Mail, among other outlets.

He was named a Marketing Science Institute Young Scholar in 2013 and a Marketing Science Institute Scholar in 2018.

== Critique of Loss Aversion and Behavioral Economics ==
Gal has argued that loss aversion is not supported by the evidence and that most phenomena attributed to loss aversion have alternative explanations that are more consistent with the evidence. In particular, Gal has cited psychological inertia as an explanation for the endowment effect and status quo bias.

In addition to his specific critique of loss aversion, Gal has argued that behavioral economics more broadly has been too concerned with understanding how behavior deviates from standard economic models rather than with understanding why people behave the way they do. Understanding why behavior occurs is necessary for the creation of generalizable knowledge, the goal of science. He has referred to behavioral economics as a triumph of marketing.
