= Eric J. Johnson =

Academic background
- Education: Rutgers University; Carnegie-Mellon University

Academic work
- Discipline: Economics
- Sub-discipline: Behavioral economics
- Institutions: Carnegie-Mellon University (1981 - 1987); University of Pennsylvania (1992 - 1997); Columbia Business School (1999 - present)

Eric J. Johnson is the inaugural holder of the Norman Eig Chair of Business, and Director of the Center for Decision Sciences, Columbia Business School at Columbia University. His research examines the interface between Psychology Economics and the decisions made by consumers, managers, and their implications for public policy, markets and marketing.

== Education ==
Johnson received a B.A. in Human Communication from Rutgers University in 1976 and an M.S. and PhD in psychology from Carnegie-Mellon University in 1978 and 1980 respectively. After completing his degree, he was a National Science Foundation post-doctoral fellow at Stanford University for one year.

== Career ==
He began his professional career at Carnegie-Mellon University in 1981 as an assistant professor of Industrial Administration at the Graduate School of Industrial Administration. He was an associate professor there from 1984 to 1987. Between 1984 and 1985, he was a visiting scholar at MIT Sloan School of Management. From 1992 to 1999, he was a professor of marketing, Decision Science and Psychology at the University of Pennsylvania and the inaugural holder of the David W. Hauck Chair in Marketing. In 1999, he joined Columbia University as a professor of business.

Johnson studies how insights from behavioral decision-making connect with economic theory. His research examines the decisions made by both consumers and managers, and what these decisions mean for public policy, markets and marketing. A central theme of his research is how the structure and presentation of options shapes decisions, for example in areas such as organ donation, environmental decisions, and reducing disparity in outcomes He is one of the original developers of Query Theory, a theory on how memory informs preferences. He has also done work on process tracing and was one of the co-developers of Mouselab Web, a tool used to monitor decision makers information acquisition on the web. Recently, Johnson's work has focused on choice architecture and its influences on public policy.

He served as an Associate Editor of the Journal of Consumer Psychology and as the Senior Editor for Decision Sciences at Behavioral Science and Policy.

== Research ==
=== Choice Architecture ===
Since early in his career, Johnson has explored different aspects of choice architecture, for example studying default effects—such as providing evidence that people defaulted into being organ donors are more likely not to switch from that default than people who must actively opt-in are to select it. Throughout his career, Johnson has continued to explore these topics. More recently, he has expanded into domains such as public policy, specifically concerning climate change. He has also contributed to a review of choice architecture, providing a toolbox for potential choice architects, and has authored a book "The Elements of Choice" describing choice architecture in a way accessible to the layperson.

=== Preferences as Memory: Query Theory ===
Elke Weber, Eric J. Johnson and his longtime collaborator and spouse, Elke Weber, have developed Query Theory, a psychological process model of how preferences are constructed in real time. The theory posits that people generate a series of internal queries during the decision-making process. The order in which people generate these queries, which can be influenced by context and framing, has been shown to significantly impact choice, both through correlation and causation. This process-tracing measure has been particularly relevant for describing phenomenon such as the endowment effect and asymmetric time discounting mechanistically.

=== Process Tracing ===
Throughout his career, Eric J. Johnson has also been interested in process-tracing measures, co-developing MouselabWeb, a tool to recover users' information acquisition on the web, via monitoring mouse-hovering events as users hover over pre-specified and blurred attributes or regions of interest on a screen to reveal their contents. He and his collaborators have used such process-tracing measures to reveal the mechanisms underlying certain consumer behavior phenomenon, for example providing evidence that search strategies predict and can change patience when making intertemporal choices.

== Writing ==
He is the author of the book "The Elements of Choice".

He has co-authored two books: Decision Research: A Field Guide and The Adaptive Decision-Maker.

== Awards and honors ==
In 2009, he was awarded an honorary doctorate in economics from the University of St. Gallen for "trail-blazing work in the field of Behavioral Economics”

In 2013, he was named a fellow of the Association for Consumer Research. He is also a fellow of the Association for Psychological Science.

In 2025 he was awarded the James McKeen Cattell Award from the Association for Psychological Science for lifetime contributions to applied psychology

== Selected Works ==
- Payne, J. W., Bettman, J. R., & Johnson, E. J. (1993). The adaptive decision maker. Cambridge university press.
- Thaler, R. H., & Johnson, E. J. (1990). Gambling with the house money and trying to break even: The effects of prior outcomes on risky choice. Management science, 36(6), 643-660.
- Johnson, E. J., & Goldstein, D. (2003). Do defaults save lives?. Science, 302(5649), 1338-1339.
- Johnson, E. J., Shu, S. B., Dellaert, B. G., Fox, C., Goldstein, D. G., Häubl, G., ... & Weber, E. U. (2012). Beyond nudges: Tools of a choice architecture. Marketing letters, 23(2), 487-504.
- Mandel, N., & Johnson, E. J. (2002). When web pages influence choice: Effects of visual primes on experts and novices. Journal of consumer research, 29(2), 235-245.
- Chapman, G. B., & Johnson, E. J. (2002). Incorporating the irrelevant: Anchors in judgments of belief and value. Heuristics and biases: The psychology of intuitive judgment, (120-138).
- Johnson, E. J., Häubl, G., & Keinan, A. (2007). Aspects of endowment: a query theory of value construction. Journal of experimental psychology: Learning, memory, and cognition, 33(3), 461.
- Weber, E. U., Johnson, E. J., Milch, K. F., Chang, H., Brodscholl, J. C., & Goldstein, D. G. (2007). Asymmetric discounting in intertemporal choice: A query-theory account. Psychological science, 18(6), 516-523.
- Reeck, C., Wall, D., & Johnson, E. J. (2017). Search predicts and changes patience in intertemporal choice. Proceedings of the National Academy of Sciences, 114(45), 11890-11895.
- Johnson, E. J., Sugerman, E. R., Morwitz, V. G., Johar, G. V., & Morris, M. W. (2024). Widespread misestimates of greenhouse gas emissions suggest low carbon competence. Nature Climate Change, 14(7), 707-714.
- Krefeld-Schwalb, A., Sugerman, E. R., & Johnson, E. J. (2024). Exposing omitted moderators: Explaining why effect sizes differ in the social sciences. Proceedings of the National Academy of Sciences, 121(12), e2306281121.
- Mrkva, K., Posner, N. A., Reeck, C., & Johnson, E. J. (2021). Do nudges reduce disparities? Choice architecture compensates for low consumer knowledge. Journal of Marketing, 85(4), 67-84.
