= Query theory =

Theory of economic choice

Query theory (QT) is a theory that proposes that preferences are constructed, rather than pre-stored and immediately retrievable (as assumed by many economic models) by individuals in accordance with the answers to one or more internally posed questions, or queries. Further, the order of such queries is dependent on the structure of the choice situation or task, and can influence retrieval of information, leading to different decisions. This is a descriptive model that attempts to explain why individuals make a decision, rather than propose an optimal decision.

== Applied to the Endowment Effect ==
Query theory was initially developed by Eric J. Johnson, Gerald Häubl, and Anat Keinan as an attempt to explain the endowment effect. This effect is, empirically, a difference between the price at which an individual is willing to purchase an object and the price at which they are willing to sell the same object. Endowment effects are traditionally explained as resulting from the investment of value based on ownership. In other words, individuals demand more money for a product they already own based upon that ownership, similar to the concept of loss aversion. A view from Query Theory, however, argues that this difference is not based in ownership, but in the thought processes involved in constructing the price judgment.

Query theory argues that when an individual is asked to give the amount of money they would be willing to purchase the product for (Willingness to Pay or WTP) or willing to sell the product for (Willingness to Accept, or WTA), a series of mental queries must be addressed. For both parties, the queries are the same (such as “What reasons are there for owning this product” or “What reasons are there for not owning this product”), however, the order in which they are processed differs. For sellers, it is theorized that the query focusing on the positives of purchasing the product is executed before the query focusing on the negatives. For buyers, the opposite order is theorized. As the theory proposes that these queries are processed serially (one after the other, not simultaneously), the first query receives more processing power, and thus is more influential. Furthermore, it is possible that the answers to this first query may interfere with subsequent responses. This argument, supported by empirical results over a series of experiments, explains the endowment effect simply. Buyers having more negative reasons available to them (thus lowering the price judgment) and sellers having more positive reasons available (raising the price judgment). When order is manipulated by specifically requesting the individual to focus first on a non-default query (e.g., sellers asked to think first about negatives of the purchase), the endowment effect is minimized or absent altogether.

== Model ==
Query theory, in its simplest form, holds that:

1. Judgments or choices are constructed based on the responses to a series of mental questions or queries.

2. These queries are processed serially (as opposed to simultaneously).

3. Earlier queries produce a larger and richer set of responses compared to later queries, due to both cognitive processing limits and interference of the first queries’ responses on subsequent queries.

== Measures ==
In order to understand how an individual makes their decision, query theory researchers rely on asking individuals to list thoughts and reasons they consider when making their decision. These are referred to as “aspects”. It is common for individuals to write these aspects down either on paper or by using a custom piece of software known as aspect lister.

A statistical method used for analyzing the tendency of an individual to produce value-increasing aspects before value-decreasing is the standardized median rank difference (SMRD). This statistic is calculated as the 2(MR_{i} – MR_{d})/n where MR_{d} is defined as the median rank of value decreasing statements in a participant's sequence, MR_{i} is the median rank of value increasing statements, and n is the total number of aspects. SMRD can be between 1 (all value-increasing statements were listed before value-decreasing) to −1 (all value-decreasing statements were listed before value-increasing). In the endowment effect research discussed above, SMRD was higher (.62) for sellers than for buyers (.26).

== Applications ==
Since its first publication, subsequent work has extended query theory to intertemporal choice, preference construction in groups, and its relationships to evaluation of sequences and consumer decision making have been discussed. Research into decision making in older populations is currently being conducted, focusing on applying query theory to understand age-related decision making differences.
