= Elke U. Weber =

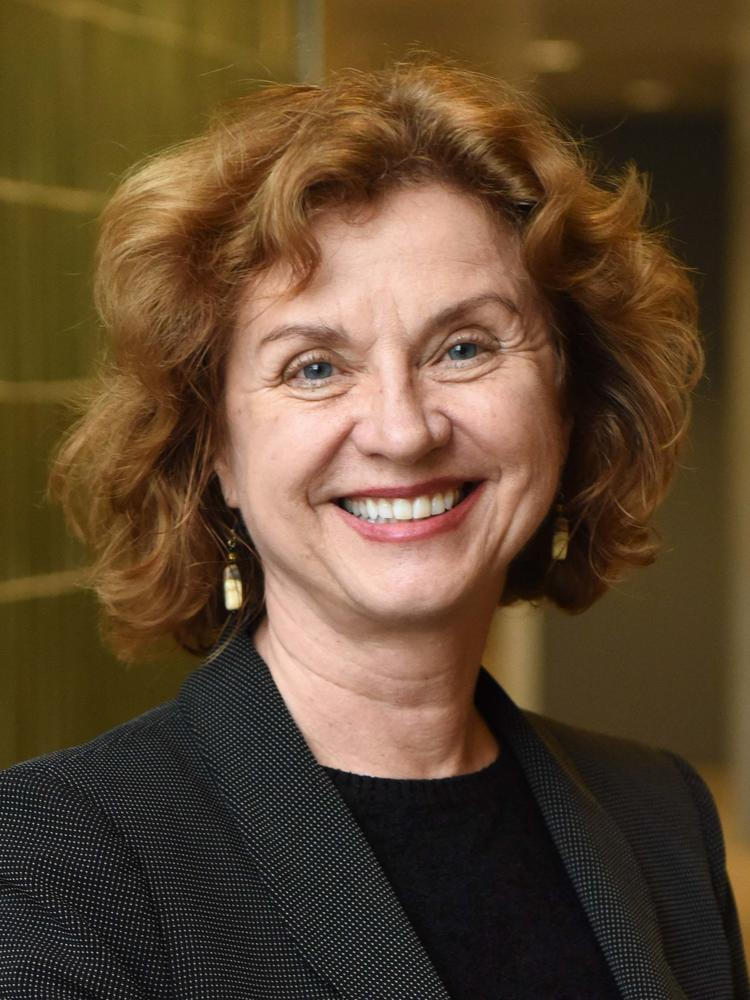
- Picture of Elke Weber
- Born: April 6, 1957 (age 69)
- Education: Harvard University, York University
- Spouse: Eric J. Johnson
- Awards: BBVA Foundation Frontiers Award in Climate Change (2024), Howard Crosby Warren Medal (2025)
- Scientific career
- Workplaces: Columbia University (1999–2016); Princeton University (2016–)

Elke U. Weber (born April 6, 1957) is a Professor of Psychology and Public Affairs at Princeton University where she holds the Gerhard R. Andlinger Professorship in Energy & the Environment. Prior to moving to Princeton in 2016, she spent 17 years at Columbia University, where she founded and co-directed the Earth Institute's Center for Research on Environmental Decisions and the Columbia Business School's Center for Decision Sciences.

== Career ==
Weber received a B.A. in Psychology from York University in 1980 and a PhD. in Psychology from Harvard University in 1984. She began her professional career at the University of Illinois at Urbana-Champaign in 1985. From 1988 to 1995, she was Assistant and then Associate Professor of Behavioral Science at the University of Chicago's Graduate School of Business. In 1995, she joined Ohio State University as Professor in the Departments of Psychology and Management and Human Resources. In 1999, Weber joined Columbia University as a Professor of Management and Professor of Psychology, and held the Jerome A. Chazen Professor of International Business from 2009 to 2016. During her time at Columbia University, she also held a position as Earth Institute professor. In 2016, she joined the faculty at Princeton as a Professor of Psychology and Public Policy. In 2020, Weber was elected to the National Academy of Sciences. In 2024, Weber received the BBVA Foundation Frontiers of Knowledge Award in the Social Sciences.

She has done research related to perceived risk, risk-taking, Query Theory, and the role that memory processes play in preference construction.

More recently, she is known for her contributions to research on choice architecture and how to apply decision research to public policy.

Weber has served as President of the Society for Neuroeconomics, the Society for Mathematical Psychology, and the Society for Judgment and Decision Making (1997–1998).

== Research ==
Elke U. Weber's research spans several areas in psychology, behavioral economics, and environmental decision-making. Her work has helped define how individuals and societies perceive risk, form preferences, and make complex decisions—especially in domains involving uncertainty, long time horizons, sustainability, and cultural context. Her contributions have garnered numerous honors, including the BBVA Foundation Frontiers of Knowledge Award, election to both the U.S. and German National Academies of Sciences, the Distinguished Achievement Award from the Society for Risk Analysis, and the Patrick Suppes Prize from the American Philosophical Society.

=== Risk Perception and Risk Taking ===
Weber is recognized for her work on how people perceive and take risks. Early in her career, she challenged the assumption that risk preference is a stable personality trait, showing instead that it is sensitive to context, domain, and culture. Her co-development of the Domain-Specific Risk-Taking (DOSPERT) scale has become a standard in the field, allowing researchers to measure risk attitudes across different areas such as health, finance, and social behavior. Her work reveals that perceived risk, rather than objective probabilities, often drives decisions, and that affective responses play a critical role in shaping risk behavior.

=== Preference and Choice as a Dynamic Construct: Query Theory ===
Along with longtime collaborator Eric Johnson, Weber developed Query Theory, a framework that treats preferences not as pre-existing, but as constructed in real time. According to this theory, people generate internal queries—mental questions that search memory for justifications—to arrive at decisions. The order in which these queries are posed, which is influenced by question format and context, can significantly influence choice, helping to explain phenomena like the endowment effect and asymmetric time discounting.

Weber and Johnson have collaborated extensively in the field of decision science, co-authoring works over nearly two decades, including papers on memory-based preference construction and mindful decision-making.

Query Theory provided a formal and testable model for the long-standing idea that preferences are labile and context-dependent. It has been used to inform interventions ranging from consumer choice architecture to financial planning tools.

=== Culture, Norms, and Society ===
Weber has explored how culture and social norms shape the ways people interpret and respond to information. Her cross-cultural research showed that while risk perceptions vary widely across societies, the influence of social norms on behavior is a universal feature of human psychology.

Her research combines psychological and anthropological perspectives to examine how social norms emerge, persist, and change, particularly in collective action contexts. She has contributed to efforts integrating behavioral science with systems thinking and network approaches to explore the role of cultural values in shaping sustainability, cooperation, and governance.

=== Climate Change Perception and Climate Change Action ===
Weber's research has examined how individuals perceive and respond to the threat of climate change. Her work highlights that climate change is often perceived as an abstract and statistical phenomenon, which can make it less likely to motivate action than more concrete extreme events.

She has explored the roles of affect, social norms, and perceived efficacy in shaping climate-related behavior, suggesting that these factors may influence willingness to act on climate issues.

Weber served as a lead author for both the Fifth and Sixth Assessment Reports of the Intergovernmental Panel on Climate Change (IPCC). Her contributions have emphasized the role of behavioral science in climate mitigation, and she has worked to integrate insights from psychology into policy frameworks.

== Awards and honors ==
Weber has received numerous awards and honors for her work.

- Fellow, Association for Psychological Science. (1998)
- Honorary degree in psychology from the University of Basel. (2009)
- Fellow, Society for Risk Analysis. (2011)
- Honorary professorship in economic science from the Technical University of Munich. (2012)
- Fellow, Society for Experimental Psychology. (2015)
- Fellow, American Academy of Arts and Sciences. (2016)
- Fellow, American Association for the Advancement of Science. (2018)
- Patrick Suppes Prize, American Philosophical Society. (2023)
- Honorary doctorate in sustainability from Leuphana University. (2024)
- Named among the 100 Best Heads in Science in Berlin. (2024)
- BBVA Foundation Frontiers of Knowledge Award in the Social Sciences. (2024)
- Newman-Proshansky Career Achievement Award, American Psychological Association (APA), Division 34 (Environmental, Population, and Conservation Psychology). (2024)
- Howard Crosby Warren Medal, Society for Experimental Psychology. (2025)

== Selected works ==
- Weber, Elke U. (1994). "From subjective probabilities to decision weights: The effect of asymmetric loss functions on the evaluation of uncertain outcomes and events". Psychological Bulletin. 115 (2): 228–242. doi:10.1037/0033-2909.115.2.228
- Weber, Elke U.; Hsee, Christopher K.; Sokolowska, Joanna (1998). "What folklore tells us about risk and risk taking: Cross-cultural comparisons of American, German, and Chinese proverbs". Organizational Behavior and Human Decision Processes. 75 (2): 170–186. doi:10.1006/obhd.1998.2812
- Weber, Elke U.; Hsee, Christopher K. (1999). "Models and mosaics: Investigating cross-cultural differences in risk perception and risk preference". Psychonomic Bulletin & Review. 6 (4): 611–617. doi:10.3758/BF03212979
- Loewenstein, George F.; Weber, Elke U.; Hsee, Christopher K.; Welch, Ned (2001). "Risk as feelings". Psychological Bulletin. 127 (2): 267–286. doi:10.1037/0033-2909.127.2.267
- Ostrom, Elinor E.; Dietz, Thomas E.; Dolšak, Nives E.; Stern, Paul C.; Stonich, Susan E.; Weber, Elke U. (2002). The drama of the commons. Washington, D.C.: National Academy Press. ISBN 0-309-06972-0.
- Weber, Elke U.; Blais, Ann-Renée; Betz, Nancy E. (2002). "A domain-specific risk-attitude scale: Measuring risk perceptions and risk behaviors". Journal of Behavioral Decision Making. 15 (4): 263–290. doi:10.1002/bdm.414
- Weber, Elke U.; Shafir, Sharoni; Blais, Ann-Renée (2004). "Predicting risk sensitivity in humans and lower animals: risk as variance or coefficient of variation". Psychological Review. 111 (2): 430–445. doi:10.1037/0033-295X.111.2.430
- Hertwig, Ralph; Barron, Greg; Weber, Elke U.; Erev, Ido (2004). "Decisions from experience and the effect of rare events in risky choice". Psychological Science. 15 (8): 534–539. doi:10.1111/j.0956-7976.2004.00715.x
- Weber, Elke U. (2006). "Experience-based and description-based perceptions of long-term risk: Why global warming does not scare us (yet)". Climatic Change. 77 (1): 103–120. doi:10.1007/s10584-006-9060-3
- Weber, Elke U.; Johnson, Eric J.; Milch, Karen F.; Chang, Heejung; Brodscholl, Jeanne C.; Goldstein, Daniel G. (2007). "Asymmetric discounting in intertemporal choice: A query-theory account". Psychological Science. 18 (6): 516–523. doi:10.1111/j.1467-9280.2007.01932.x
- Weber, Elke U.; Johnson, Eric J. (2009). "Mindful judgment and decision making". Annual Review of Psychology. 60 (1): 53–85. doi:10.1146/annurev.psych.60.110707.163633
- Weber, Elke U. (2010). "What shapes perceptions of climate change?". Wiley Interdisciplinary Reviews: Climate Change. 1 (3): 332–342. doi:10.1002/wcc.41
- Hardisty, Daniel J.; Johnson, Eric J.; Weber, Elke U. (2010). "A dirty word or a dirty world? Attribute framing, political affiliation, and query theory". Psychological Science. 21 (1): 86–92. doi:10.1177/0956797609355572
- Weber, Markus; Weber, Elke U.; Nosic, Ana (2013). "Who takes risks when and why: Determinants of changes in investor risk taking". Review of Finance. 17 (3): 847–883. doi:10.1093/rof/rfs021
- Weber, Elke U. (2017). "Breaking cognitive barriers to a sustainable future". Nature Human Behaviour. 1 (1): 0013. doi:10.1038/s41562-016-0013
- Creutzig, Felix; Roy, Joyashree; Lamb, William F.; Azevedo, Inês M.L.; Bruine de Bruin, Wändi; Dalkmann, Holger; ... Weber, Elke U. (2018). "Towards demand-side solutions for mitigating climate change". Nature Climate Change. 8 (4): 260–263. doi:10.1038/s41558-018-0121-1
- Jachimowicz, Jon M.; Duncan, Scott; Weber, Elke U.; Johnson, Eric J. (2019). "When and why defaults influence decisions: A meta-analysis of default effects". Behavioural Public Policy. 3 (2): 159–186. doi:10.1017/bpp.2018.22
