= Rigidity (psychology) =

Mechanisms of overcoming risky behaviors

Rigid thinking
- Other names: Mental rigidity, cognitive rigidity, behavioral rigidity, cognitive inflexibility
- Field: Psychology
- Origin: 19th century
- Purpose: To describe a difficulty experienced by people who have trouble switching from one mental thought pattern to another

In psychology, rigidity, or mental rigidity, refers to an obstinate inability to yield or a refusal to appreciate another person's viewpoint or emotions and the tendency to perseverate, which is the inability to change habits and modify concepts and attitudes once developed. The opposite of rigidity is cognitive flexibility.

A specific example of rigidity is functional fixedness, which is a difficulty conceiving new uses for familiar objects: a fork is for eating, and it cannot be used for other purposes, such as holding a piece of paper upright or digging in the dirt. Another example of mental rigidity is making a plan (e.g., to eat frozen waffles for breakfast tomorrow) and being unable to adjust that plan when circumstances change (e.g., if someone else eats the waffles today). A person showing cognitive flexibility would think of alternatives, such as buying more waffles before tomorrow's breakfast or deciding to eat pancakes instead of waffles tomorrow.

Different things have been called rigid thinking, including dogmatism, a strong desire for psychological closure (e.g., needing an explanation for why something bad happened, even when no explanation is possible), the type of rigid thinking identified by the cognitive reflection test, and cognitive inflexibility.

== History ==
Rigidity is an ancient part of our human cognition. Systematic research on rigidity can be found tracing back to Gestalt psychologists, going as far back as the late 19th to early 20th century with Max Wertheimer, Wolfgang Köhler, and Kurt Koffka in Germany. In the early stages of approaching the idea of rigidity, it is treated as "a unidimensional continuum ranging from rigid at one end to flexible at the other.” This idea dates back to the 1800s and was later articulated by Charles Spearman, who described it as mental inertia. Prior to 1960, many definitions for the term rigidity were afloat. One example includes Kurt Goldstein's, which he stated, "adherence to a present performance in an inadequate way" Others have simplified rigidity down to stages for easy defining. Generally, it is agreed upon that it is evidenced by the identification of mental or behavioral sets.

Lewin and Kounin also proposed a theory of cognitive rigidity (also called Lewin-Kounin formulation) based on a Gestalt perspective, using it to explain particular behavior in people with intellectual disability that is inflexible, repetitive, and unchanging. The theory proposed that it is caused by a greater "stiffness," or impermeability between inner-personal regions of individuals, which influence behavior. Rigidity was particularly explored in Lewin's views regarding the degree of differentiation among children. He posited that an intellectually disabled child can be distinguished from the typically developing child due to the smaller capacity for dynamic rearrangement in terms of his psychical systems.

== Mental set ==
Mental sets represent a form of rigidity in which an individual behaves or believes in a certain way due to prior experience. The opposite of this is termed cognitive flexibility. These mental sets may not always be consciously recognized by the bearer. In the field of psychology, mental sets are typically examined in the process of problem solving, with an emphasis on the process of breaking away from particular mental sets into formulation of insight. Breaking mental sets in order to successfully resolve problems fall under three typical stages: a) tendency to solve a problem in a fixed way, b) unsuccessfully solving a problem using methods suggested by prior experience, and c) realizing that the solution requires different methods.

Components of high executive functioning, such as the interplay between working memory and inhibition, are essential to effective switching between mental sets for different situations. Individual differences in mental sets vary, with one study producing a variety of cautious and risky strategies in individual responses to a reaction time test.

== Causes ==
Rigidity can be a learned behavioral trait; for example, if the subject has a parent, boss, or teacher who demonstrated the same form of behavior towards them.

Rigidity also has a genetic component and is commonly associated with autism.

Temporary increases in mental rigidity can be caused by sleep deprivation.

== Stages ==
Rigidity has three different main "stages" of severity, although it never has to move to further stages. The first stage is a strict perception that causes one to persist in their ways and be close-minded to other things. The second involves a motive to defend the ego. The third stage is that it is a part of one's personality and you can see it in their perception, cognition, and social interactions.

== Associated traits ==
Behaviors which often accompany rigidity include:

- Insistently repetitious behavior (perseveration)
- Difficulty with unmet expectations
- Perfectionism
- Compulsions (as in OCD)

== Associated conditions ==
Cognitive rigidity is associated with many psychological and psychiatric conditions, including eating disorders, and schizophrenia.

=== Cognitive closure ===
Mental rigidity often features a high need for cognitive closure, meaning that the person may prematurely assign explanations to things. People with a high need for closure find that resolution of the uncertainty and ambiguity is as reassuring as finding the truth.

=== Autism ===
Cognitive rigidity is one feature of autism spectrum disorder (ASD). It is included in what's called the Broader Autism Phenotype, where a collection of autistic traits still fail to reach the level of ASD. This is one example of how rigidity does not show up as a single trait, but comes with a number of related traits.

== Effects ==
=== Ethnocentrism ===
Rigidity may be a cause of ethnocentrism. In one study, M. Rokeach tested for ethnocentrism's relatedness to mental rigidity by using the California Ethnocentrism Scale (when measuring American college students' views) and the California Attitude Scale (when measuring children's views) before they were given what is called by cognitive scientists the water-jar problem. This problem teaches students a set pattern for how to solve each mathematical question. Those that scored higher in ethnocentrism also showed attributes of rigidity, such as persistence of mental sets and more complicated thought processes.

=== Limited relationship to political views ===
Rigid thinking has been ascribed to political conservatism since at least 1950, when The Authoritarian Personality was published. However, the ideological asymmetry perspective is only a partial explanation of the facts, and the actual difference is both small and depends upon the measurement used and the beliefs being studied. Social conservatism is associated with self-reported dogmatism, but less so with other measures of rigid thinking. There is no correlation between economic conservatism and behavioral measures (as opposed to self-reports) of cognitive rigidity. Political extremism on both left and right is associated with more rigidity than political moderates.

=== Consequences of unfulfillment ===
If a person with cognitive rigidity does not fulfill their rigidly held expectations, they may feel agitated, behave aggressively, or engage in self-injurious behavior. They might also experience depression, anxiety, or suicidality.

=== Association with aggression and violence ===
Neuropsychological and forensic research indicates that cognitive rigidity is a significant factor in interpersonal aggression, criminal behavior, and violent extremism. In forensic populations, cognitive inflexibility—often assessed through executive function measures like the Wisconsin Card Sorting Test—impairs an individual's ability to process alternative behavioral feedback or adapt to changing social cues, thereby heightening the risk of aggressive outbursts.

Furthermore, psychological studies evaluating ideological and political violence demonstrate that cognitive rigidity correlates with an individual's radicalization trajectory. Individuals exhibiting lower cognitive flexibility on behavioral tests show a significantly higher willingness to engage in self-sacrifice, support intergroup violence, and commit to extremist causes on behalf of an ideological tribe. This relationship stems from a reliance on categorical, black-and-white mental frameworks that struggle to tolerate nuance or integrate conflicting information during perceived social or existential threats.

== See also ==
- Set (psychology)
- Cognitive inertia
- Neuroplasticity
- Cognitive flexibility
- Einstellung effect
- Abnormal posturing
