= Antiprocess =

Antiprocess is the preemptive recognition and marginalization of undesired information by the interplay of mental defense mechanisms: the subconscious compromises information that would cause cognitive dissonance. It is often used to describe a difficulty encountered when people with sharply contrasting viewpoints are attempting (and failing) to discuss a topic.

In other words, when one is debating with another, there may be a baffling disconnect despite one's apparent understanding of the argument. Despite the apparently sufficient understanding to formulate counter-arguments, the mind of the debater does not allow him to be swayed by that knowledge.

There are many instances on the Internet where antiprocess can be observed, but the prime location to see it is in Usenet discussion groups, where discussions tend to be highly polarized. In such debates, both sides appear to have a highly sophisticated understanding of the other position, yet neither side is swayed. As a result, the debate can continue for years without any progress being made.

== Dynamics ==
Antiprocess occurs because:

1. The mind is capable of multitasking;
2. The mind has the innate capability to evaluate and select information at a preconscious level so that we are not overwhelmed with the processing requirements;
3. It is not feasible to maintain two contradictory beliefs at the same time;
4. It is not possible for people to be aware of every factor leading up to decisions they make;
5. People learn argumentatively effective but logically invalid defensive strategies (such as rhetorical fallacies);
6. People tend to favour strategies of thinking that have served them well in the past; and
7. The truth is just too unpalatable to the mind to accept.

The ramifications of these factors are that people can be engaged in a debate sincerely, yet the appearances suggest that they are not. This can lead to acrimony if neither party is aware of antiprocess and does not adjust his or her debating style accordingly.

== See also ==
- Defence mechanisms, psychological
