= Industrial inertia =

Industry preferring its former location

Geographical industrial inertia is a stage at which an industry prefers to run in its former location although the main alluring factors are gone. For example, the raw material source is depleted or an energy crisis has emerged.

An industry may still like to stay in its former position because of its fixed cost (land capital etc.). A firm may also decide to stay in its former location if:

1. there is linkage with other activities of the area
2. it is in a favorable location for transportation
3. there is a skilled labour force

== See also ==
- Diseconomies of scale
