= Status quo bias =

Cognitive bias

A status quo bias, or default bias is a cognitive bias that results from a preference for the maintenance of one's existing state of affairs. The current baseline (or status quo) is taken as a reference point, and any change from that baseline is perceived as a loss or gain. Corresponding to different alternatives, this current baseline or default option is perceived and evaluated by individuals as a positive.

Status quo bias should be distinguished from a rational preference for the status quo, in which the current state of affairs is more beneficial than the available alternatives, and when imperfect information is present. Status quo bias should also be distinguished from psychological inertia, which refers to a lack of intervention in the current course of affairs.

The bias intersects with other non-rational cognitive processes such as loss aversion, in which losses comparative to gains are weighed to a greater extent. Further non-rational cognitive processes include existence bias, endowment effect, longevity, mere exposure, and regret avoidance. Experimental evidence for the detection of status quo bias is seen through the use of the reversal test. A vast amount of experimental and field examples exist. Behavior in regard to economics, retirement plans, health, and ethical choices shows evidence of the status quo bias.

== Examples ==
Status quo experiments have been conducted in many fields, with Kahneman, Thaler, and Knetsch (1991) creating experiments on the endowment effect, loss aversion, and status quo bias. Experiments have also been conducted on the effect of status quo bias on contributions to retirement plans and Fevrier & Gay (2004) study on status quo bias in organ donations consent.

Questionnaire: Samuelson and Zeckhauser (1988) demonstrated status quo bias using a questionnaire in which subjects faced a series of decision problems, which were alternately framed to be with and without a pre-existing status quo position. Subjects tended to remain with the status quo when such a position was offered to them. Results of the experiment further show that status quo bias advantage relatively increases with the number of alternatives given within the choice set. Furthermore, a weaker bias resulted from when the individual exhibited a strong discernible preference for a chosen alternative.

Hypothetical choice tasks: Samuelson and Zeckhauser (1988) gave subjects a hypothetical choice task in the following "neutral" version, in which no status quo was defined: "You are a serious reader of the financial pages but until recently you have had few funds to invest. That is when you inherited a large sum of money from your great-uncle. You are considering different portfolios. Your choices are to invest in: a moderate-risk company, a high-risk company, treasury bills, municipal bonds." Other subjects were presented with the same problem but with one of the options designated as the status quo. In this case, the opening passage continued: "A significant portion of this portfolio is invested in a moderate risk company ... (The tax and broker commission consequences of any changes are insignificant.)" The result was that an alternative became much more popular when it was designated as the status quo.

Electric power consumers: California electric power consumers were asked about their preferences regarding trade-offs between service reliability and rates. The respondents fell into two groups, one with much more reliable service than the other. Each group was asked to state a preference among six combinations of reliability and rates, with one of the combinations designated as the status quo. A strong bias to the status quo was observed. Of those in the high-reliability group, 60.2 percent chose the status quo, whereas a mere 5.7 percent chose the low-reliability option that the other group had been experiencing, despite its lower rates. Similarly, of those in the low reliability group, 58.3 chose their low-reliability status quo, and only 5.8 chose the high-reliability option.

Automotive insurance consumers: The US states of New Jersey and Pennsylvania inadvertently ran a real-life experiment providing evidence of status quo bias in the early 1990s. As part of tort law reform programs, citizens were offered two options for their automotive insurance: an expensive option giving them full right to sue and a less expensive option with restricted rights to sue. In New Jersey the cheaper insurance was the default and in Pennsylvania the expensive insurance was the default. Johnson, Hershey, Meszaros and Kunreuther (1993) conducted a questionnaire to test whether consumers will stay with the default option for car insurance. They found that only 20% of New Jersey drivers changed from the default option and got the more expensive option. Also, only 25% of Pennsylvanian drivers changed from the default option and got the cheaper insurance. Therefore, framing and status quo bias can have significant financial consequences.

General practitioners: Boonen, Donkers and Schut created two discrete choice experiments for Dutch residents to conclude a consumer's preference for general practitioners and whether they would leave their current practitioner. The Dutch health care system was chosen as general practitioners play the role of a gatekeeper. The experiment was conducted to investigate the effect of status quo bias on a consumer's decision to leave their current practitioner, with knowledge of other practitioners and their current relationship with their practitioner determining the role status quo bias plays.

Through the questionnaire it was shown that respondents were aware of the lack of added benefit aligned with their current general practitioner and were aware of the quality differences between potential practitioners. 35% of respondents were willing to a pay a copayment to stay with their current general practitioner, while only 30% were willing to switch to another practitioner in exchange for a financial gain. These consumers were willing to pay a considerable amount to continue going to their current practitioner up to €17.32. For general practitioners the value assigned by the consumer to staying with their current one exceeded the total value assigned to all other attributes tested such as discounts or a certificate of quality.

Within the discrete choice experiment the respondents were offered a choice between their current practitioner and a hypothetical provider with identical attributes. The respondents were 40% more likely to choose their current practitioner than if both options were hypothetical providers, which would result in the probability being 50% percent for both. It was found that status quo bias had a massive impact on which general practitioner the respondents would choose. Despite consumers being offered positive financial incentives, qualitative incentives or the addition of negative financial incentives respondents were still extremely hesitant to switch from their current practitioner. The impact of status quo bias was determined as making attempts to channel consumers away from the general practitioner they are currently seeing a daunting task.

== Explanations ==
Status quo bias has been attributed to a combination of loss aversion and the endowment effect, two ideas relevant to prospect theory. An individual weighs the potential losses of switching from the status quo more heavily than the potential gains; this is due to the prospect theory value function being steeper in the loss domain. As a result, the individual will prefer not to switch at all. In other words, we tend to oppose change unless the benefits outweigh the risks. However, the status quo bias is maintained even in the absence of gain/loss framing: for example, when subjects were asked to choose the colour of their new car, they tended towards one colour arbitrarily framed as the status quo. Loss aversion, therefore, cannot wholly explain the status quo bias, with other potential causes including regret avoidance, transaction costs and psychological commitment.

=== Rational routes to status quo maintenance ===
A status quo bias can also be a rational route if there are cognitive or informational limitations.

Informational limitations

Decision outcomes are rarely certain, nor is the utility they may bring. Because some errors are more costly than others (Haselton & Nettle, 2006), sticking with what worked in the past is a safe option, as long as previous decisions are "good enough".

Cognitive limitations

Cognitive limitations of status quo bias involve the cognitive cost of choice, in which decisions are more susceptible to postponement as increased alternatives are added to the choice set. Moreover, mental effort needed to maintain status quo alternatives would often be lesser and easier, resulting in a superior choice's benefit being outweighed by decision-making cognitive costs. Consequently, maintenance of current or previous state of affairs would be regarded as the easier alternative.

=== Irrational routes ===
The irrational maintenance of the status quo bias links and confounds many cognitive biases.

Existence bias

An assumption of longevity and goodness are part of the status quo bias. People treat existence as a prima facie case for goodness, aesthetic and longevity increases this preference. The status quo bias affects people's preferences; people report preferences for what they are likely rather than unlikely to receive. People simply assume, with little reason or deliberation, the goodness of existing states.

Longevity is a corollary of the existence bias: if existence is good, longer existence should be better. This thinking resembles quasi-evolutionary notions of "survival of the fittest", and also the augmentation principle in attribution theory.

Psychological inertia is another reason used to explain a bias towards the status quo. Another explanation is fear of regret in making a wrong decision, i.e. If we choose a partner, when we think there could be someone better out there.

=== Mere exposure ===
Mere exposure is an explanation for the status quo bias. Existing states are encountered more frequently than non-existent states and because of this they will be perceived as more true and evaluated more preferably. One way to increase liking for something is repeated exposure over time.

Loss aversion

Loss aversion also leads to greater regret for action than for inaction; more regret is experienced when a decision changes the status quo than when it maintains it. Together these forces provide an advantage for the status quo; people are motivated to do nothing or to maintain current or previous decisions. Change is avoided, and decision makers stick with what has been done in the past.

Changes from the status quo will typically involve both gains and losses, with the change having good overall consequences if the gains outweigh these losses. A tendency to overemphasize the avoidance of losses will thus favour retaining the status quo, resulting in a status quo bias. Even though choosing the status quo may entail forfeiting certain positive consequences, when these are represented as forfeited "gains" they are psychologically given less weight than the "losses" that would be incurred if the status quo were changed.

The loss aversion explanation for the status quo bias has been challenged by David Gal and Derek Rucker who argue that evidence for loss aversion (i.e., a tendency to avoid losses more than to pursue gains) is confounded with a tendency towards inertia (a tendency to avoid intervention more than to intervene in the course of affairs). Inertia, in this sense, is related to omission bias, except it need not be a bias but might be perfectly rational behavior stemming from transaction costs or lack of incentive to intervene due to fuzzy preferences.

Omission bias

Omission bias may account for some of the findings previously ascribed to status quo bias. Omission bias is diagnosed when a decision maker prefers a harmful outcome that results from an omission to a less harmful outcome that results from an action.

Overall implications of a study conducted by Ilana Ritov and Jonathan Baron, regarding status quo and omission biases, reveal that omission bias may further be diagnosed when the decision maker is unwilling to take preference from any of the available options given to them, thus enabling reduction of the number of decisions where utility comparison and weight is unavoidable.

=== Detection ===
The reversal test: when a proposal to change a certain parameter is thought to have bad overall consequences, consider a change to the same parameter in the opposite direction. If this is also thought to have bad overall consequences, then the onus is on those who reach these conclusions to explain why our position cannot be improved through changes to this parameter. If they are unable to do so, then we have reason to suspect that they suffer from status quo bias. The rationale of the reversal test is: if a continuous parameter admits of a wide range of possible values, only a tiny subset of which can be local optima, then it is prima facie implausible that the actual value of that parameter should just happen to be at one of these rare local optima.

=== Neural activity ===
A study found that erroneous status quo rejections have a greater neural impact than erroneous status quo acceptances. This asymmetry in the genesis of regret might drive the status quo bias on subsequent decisions.

A study was done using a visual detection task in which subjects tended to favour the default when making difficult, but not easy, decisions. This bias was suboptimal in that more errors were made when the default was accepted. A selective increase in sub-thalamic nucleus (STN) activity was found when the status quo was rejected in the face of heightened decision difficulty. Analysis of effective connectivity showed that inferior frontal cortex, a region more active for difficult decisions, exerted an enhanced modulatory influence on the STN during switches away from the status quo.

Research by University College London scientists that examines the neural pathways involved in 'status quo bias' in the human brain and found that the more difficult the decision we face, the more likely we are not to act. The study, published in Proceedings of the National Academy of Sciences (PNAS), looked at the decision-making of participants taking part in a tennis 'line judgement' game while their brains were scanned using functional MRI (fMRI). The 16 study participants were asked to look at a cross between two tramlines on a screen while holding down a 'default' key. They then saw a ball land in the court and had to make a decision as to whether it was in or out. On each trial, the computer signalled which was the current default option – 'in' or 'out'. The participants continued to hold down the key to accept the default and had to release it and change to another key to reject the default. The results showed a consistent bias towards the default, which led to errors. As the task became more difficult, the bias became even more pronounced. The fMRI scans showed that a region of the brain known as the sub-thalamic nucleus (STN) was more active in the cases when the default was rejected. Also, greater flow of information was seen from a separate region sensitive to difficulty (the prefrontal cortex) to the STN. This indicates that the STN plays a key role in overcoming status quo bias when the decision is difficult.

=== Behavioral economics and the default position ===
Against this background, two behavioral economists devised an opt-out plan to help employees of a particular company build their retirement savings. In an opt-out plan, the employees are automatically enrolled unless they explicitly ask to be excluded. They found evidence for status quo bias and other associated effects. The impact of defaults on decision making due to status quo bias is not purely due to subconscious bias, as it has been found that even when disclosing the intent of the default to consumers, the effect of the default is not reduced.

An experiment conducted by Sen Geng, regarding status quo bias and decision time allocation, reveal that individuals allocate more attention to default options in comparison to alternatives. This is due to individuals who are mainly risk-averse who seek to attain greater expected utility and decreased subjective uncertainty in making their decision. Furthermore, by optimally allocating more time and asymmetric attention to default options or positions, the individual's estimate of the default's value is consequently more precise than estimates of alternatives. This behavior thus reflects the individual's asymmetric choice error, and is therefore an indication of status quo bias.

=== Conflict ===
Status-quo educational bias can be both a barrier to political progress and a threat to the state's legitimacy and argue that the values of stability, compliance, and patriotism underpin important reasons for status quo bias that appeal not to the substantive merits of existing institutions but merely to the fact that those institutions are the status quo.

== Relevant fields ==
The status quo bias is seen in important real life decisions; it has been found to be prominent in data on selections of health care plans and retirement programs.

=== Politics ===
There is a belief that preference for the status quo represents a core component of conservative ideology in societies where government power is limited and laws restricting actions of individuals exist. Conversely, in liberal societies, movements to impose restrictions on individuals or governments are met with widespread opposition by those that favor the status quo. Regardless of the type of society, the bias tends to hinder progressive movements in the absence of a reaction or backlash against the powers that be.

=== Ethics ===
Status quo bias may be responsible for much of the opposition to human enhancement in general and to genetic cognitive enhancement in particular. Some ethicists argue, however, that status quo bias may not be irrational in such cases. The rationality of status quo bias is also an important question in the ethics of disability.

=== Education ===
Education can (sometimes unintentionally) encourage children's belief in the substantive merits of a particular existing law or political institution, where the effect does not derive from an improvement in their ability or critical thinking about that law or institution. However, this biasing effect is not automatically illegitimate or counterproductive: a balance between social inculcation and openness needs to be maintained.

Given that educational curriculums are developed by governments and delivered by individuals with their own political thoughts and feelings, the content delivered may be inadvertently affected by bias. When governments implement certain policies, they become the status quo and are then presented as such to children in the education system. Whether through intentional or unintentional means, when learning about a topic, educators may favour the status quo. They may simply not know the full extent of the arguments against the status quo or may not be able to present an unbiased account of each side because of their personal biases.

=== Health ===
An experiment to determine if a status-quo bias, toward current medication even when better alternatives are offered—, exists in a stated-choice study among asthma patients who take prescription combination maintenance medications. The results of this study indicate that the status quo bias may exist in stated-choice studies, especially with medications that patients must take daily such as asthma maintenance medications. Stated-choice practitioners should include a current medication in choice surveys to control for this bias.

=== Retirement plans ===
A study in 1986 examined the effect of status quo bias on those planning their retirement savings when given the yearly choice between two investment funds. Participants were able to choose how to proportionally split their retirement savings between the two funds at the beginning of each year. After each year, they were able to amend their chose split without switching costs as their preferences changed. Even though the two funds had vastly different returns in both absolute and relative terms, the majority of participants never switched the preferences across the trial period. Status quo bias was also more evident in older participants as they preferred to stay with their original investment, rather than switching as new information came to light.

=== In negotiation ===
Korobkin's has studied a link between negotiation and status quo bias in 1998. In this studies shows that in negotiating contracts favor inaction that exist in situations in which a legal standard and defaults from contracts will administer absent action. This involves a biased opinion opposed to alternative solutions. Heifetz's and Segev's study in 2004 found support for existence of a toughness bias. It is like so-called endowment effect which affects seller's behavior.

=== Price management ===
Status quo bias provides a maintenance role in the theory-practice gap in price management, and is revealed in Dominic Bergers' research regarding status quo bias and its individual differences from a price management perspective. He identified status quo bias as a possible influencer of 22 rationality deficits identified and explained by Rullkötter (2009), and is further attributed to deficits within Simon and Fassnacht's (2016) price management process phases. Status quo bias remained as an underlying possible cause of 16 of the 22 rationality deficits. Examples of these can be seen within the analysis phase and implementation phase of price management processes.

Bergers reveal that status quo bias within the former price management process phase potentially led to complete reliance on external information sources that existed traditionally. This bias, through a price management perspective, can be demonstrated when monitoring competitor's pricing. In the latter phase, status quo bias potentially led to the final price being determined by decentralised staff, which is potentially perpetuated by existing system profitability within price management practices.

=== Mutual fund market ===
An empirical study conducted by Alexandre Kempf and Stefan Ruenzi examined the presence of status quo bias within the U.S. equity mutual fund market, and the extent in which this depends on the number of alternatives given. Using real data obtained from the U.S. mutual fund market, this study reveals status quo bias influences fund investors, in which a stronger correlation for positive dependence of status quo bias was found when the number of alternatives was larger, and therefore confirms Samuelson and Zeckhauser (1988) experimental results.

=== Economic research ===
Status quo bias has a significant impact on economics research and policy creation. Anchoring and adjustment theory in economics is where people's decision-making and outcome are affected by their initial reference point. The reference point for a consumer is usually the status quo. Status quo bias results in the default option to be better understood by consumers compared to alternatives options. This results in the status quo option providing less uncertainty and higher expected utility for risk-averse decision makers. Status quo bias is compounded by loss aversion theory where consumers see disadvantages as larger than advantages when making decision away from the reference point. Economics can also describe the effect of loss aversion graphically with a consumer's utility function for losses having a negative and 2 times steeper curve than the utility function for gains. Therefore, they perceive the negative effect of a loss as more significant and will stay with status quo. Consumers choosing the status quo goes against rational consumer choice theory as they are not maximising their utility. Rational consumer choice theory underpins many economic decisions by defining a set of rules for consumer behavior. Therefore, status quo bias has substantial implications in economic theory.

== See also ==
- Appeal to tradition
- Comfort zone
- Conventional wisdom
- De facto standard
- Default effect
- Endowment effect
- List of cognitive biases
- Omission bias
- Pro-innovation bias
- Situationism (psychology)
- Social norm
- System justification
