= Psychological inertia =

Concept in behavioral economics

Psychological inertia is the tendency to maintain the status quo (or default option) unless compelled by a psychological motive to intervene or reject this.

Psychological inertia is similar to the status-quo bias but there is an important distinction in that psychological inertia involves inhibiting any action, whereas the status-quo bias involves avoiding any change as it would be perceived as a loss.

Research into psychological inertia is limited, particularly into its causes, but it has been seen to affect decision-making by causing individuals to automatically choose or prefer the default option, even if there is a more beneficial option available to them, unless motivated to reject this option. For example, psychological inertia may cause individuals to continue with their investments later than they should, despite information telling them otherwise, causing them to suffer greater losses than they would have if they had disinvested earlier.

Psychological inertia has also seen to be relevant in areas of health, crime and within the workplace.

== Loss aversion vs psychological inertia ==
David Gal and Derek Rucker both suggest that psychological inertia could be a more suitable explanation for phenomena such as the status-quo bias and the endowment effect than loss aversion.

=== Status quo bias ===
The psychological inertia account asserts that the reason individuals choose to remain at the status quo is due to a lack of psychological motive to change this behaviour rather than through the weighing up of losses and gains in this decision. Both explanations were tested by David Gal in a study where subjects were asked to imagine that they owned a quarter minted in either Denver or Philadelphia. They were then given the choice of exchanging their coin with one minted in the other city, assuming insignificant time and effort involved in this process. It was found that 85% of participants chose to retain their original coin which can be explained by the inertia account of remaining at the status quo. However, the loss aversion account is unable to explain this decision as it does not provide insight into a propensity towards the status-quo when the option values are equivalent.

=== Endowment effect ===
The endowment effect, i.e. greater value being placed on objects that are owned than those that are not, has been shown to be caused by loss aversion. This was demonstrated in Daniel Kahneman's study in 1990 where participants who were given a mug demanded, on average, around seven dollars to part with it. Whereas, individuals who were not given a mug were only willing to spend, on average, around three dollars on the same mug. This therefore demonstrated that losses exert a greater impact than gains. However, it could also be seen as evidence for psychological inertia as the participants were provided with the same objects and therefore, as they were indifferent to them, they chose to maintain the status quo as there was no incentive to trade.

== Inability to break with tradition ==
The 1998 article "Psychological Inertia" by James Kowalick refers to a company where the president was displeased that company management had little knowledge of what was going on in the manufacturing department. The management team was not approachable and looked down on employees that were not managers. "Remaining behind the sacred doors of one's managerial office had become quite a tradition." To address this issue, the president asked each manager to present a manufacturing procedure in detail at the staff meeting while the other managers asked penetrating questions. As a result, in short time, managers were on the production floor learning the procedures. This form of PI represents "cultural and traditional programming".

== Examples and applications ==
=== Health ===
Avolition has been understood as a core symptom in schizophrenia, however, the drives of it are unclear. One possible drive that may underlie avolition is psychological inertia. It has been argued that as individuals with schizophrenia may be less able to convert their preferences into actions, they may display an increased tendency to maintain a current state, even if they attribute greater value to a different option available. Therefore, this causes these individuals to display greater levels of psychological inertia, and since this process inhibits their action, its presence could drive avolition. James Gold found that motivational impairments of schizophrenia may be associated with abnormalities in estimating the "cost" of effortful behaviour leading to increased psychological inertia which, in turn, could lead to increased avolition in these individuals. However, research into links between psychological inertia and schizophrenia is limited as is their relationship to avolition. For example, research is needed to explore whether the differences in levels of psychological inertia in individuals with schizophrenia only occur when there is a need to engage high levels of inertia or when the individual displays a high level of avolition. Research has shown, however, that the differences in levels of psychological inertia among individuals with schizophrenia is not only due to avolition but could be caused by attention deficits or action-readiness deficits.

=== Crime ===
Psychological inertia is believed to be one explanation factor in crime continuity, that is the persistence of criminal behaviour. Glenn Walter's psychological inertia theorem states that crime continuity is partly caused by cognitive factors that account for the continuity in behaviour between past and future criminality and derives from his broader 'lifestyle theory' model, which explains the overall development of a criminal lifestyle. Walter's theorem is based upon Newton's law of inertia which states that a body will remain in motion until acted upon by an outside force, in which the body in motion is crime. Within this theorem, Walter attributes six slow-changing variables that when combined link past criminality with future criminality. These six cognitive variables are:

1. Criminal thinking (antisocial attitudes and irrational thought patterns)
2. Positive outcome expectancies for crime (belief that crime will have specific positive outcomes)
3. Attribution biases (tendency to view the world as hostile and others as malicious)
4. Efficacy expectations (lack of confidence in one's ability to avoid criminal opportunities in the future)
5. Goals (i.e. focus on short-term goals which becomes detrimental to long-term goals)
6. Values (pursuit of self-indulgent pleasure and immediate gratification)

The psychological inertia theorem argues that criminal involvement gives rise to these six cognitive variables which then encourage further offending behaviour.

Theories surrounding the expectation of behavioural continuity are a topic of debate in the criminal justice community. But the conventional wisdom that past behaviour is the best predictor of future behaviour has generally led to "an expectation that offenders with histories of criminal violence in the community are at increased risk for disruptive conduct in prison [and] has been operationalized as a routine component in prison risk classifications".

=== Workplace ===
Psychological inertia has been found to be prevalent in change management within the workplace due to the fact it causes individuals to feel anxiety and fear as a result of any type of change away from the status-quo which may bring new responsibilities and roles. There are a variety of different interventions that have been suggested to overcome this psychological inertia which include providing fuller information including explaining the benefits that such a change will bring, causing people to feel less anxious and more motivated to carry out this change.

== See also ==
- Cognitive inertia
- Knowledge inertia
- Social inertia
- Projection bias – Tendency to falsely project current preferences onto a future event
