= Loss aversion =

Aspect of decision and prospect theories

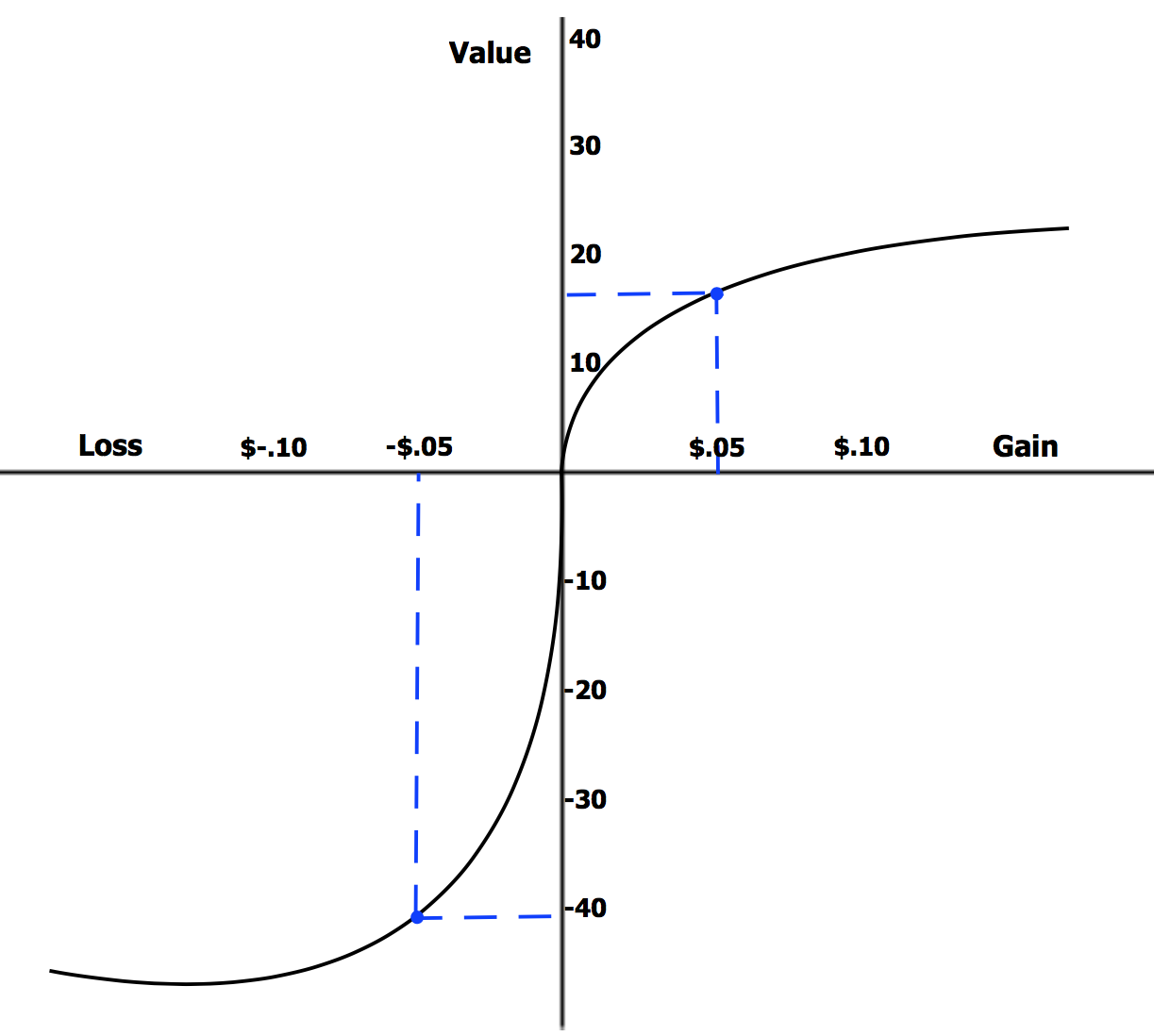
Figure 1, a graph of perceived value of gain and loss vs. strict numerical value of gain and loss. A loss of $0.05 is perceived as having a greater utility loss than the utility increase of a comparable gain.

In cognitive science and behavioral economics, loss aversion is a cognitive bias in which the same situation is perceived as worse if it is framed as a loss, rather than a gain. It should not be confused with risk aversion, which describes the rational behavior of valuing an uncertain outcome at less than its expected value.

When defined in terms of the pseudo-utility function as in cumulative prospect theory (CPT), the left-hand of the function increases much more steeply than gains, thus being more "painful" than the satisfaction from a comparable gain. Empirically, losses tend to be treated as if they were twice as large as an equivalent gain. Loss aversion was first proposed by Amos Tversky and Daniel Kahneman as an important component of prospect theory.

== History ==
In 1979, Daniel Kahneman and his associate Amos Tversky originally coined the term "loss aversion" in their initial proposal of prospect theory as an alternative descriptive model of decision making under risk. "The response to losses is stronger than the response to corresponding gains" is Kahneman's definition of loss aversion.

After the first 1979 proposal in the prospect theory framework paper, Tversky and Kahneman used loss aversion for a paper in 1991 about a consumer choice theory that incorporates reference dependence, loss aversion, and diminishing sensitivity. Compared to the original paper above that discusses loss aversion in risky choices, Tversky and Kahneman (1991) discuss loss aversion in riskless choices, for instance, not wanting to trade or even sell something that is already in our possession. Here, "losses loom larger than gains" correspondingly reflects how outcomes below the reference level (e.g. what we do not own) loom larger than those above the reference level (e.g. what we own), showing people's tendency to value losses more than gains relative to a reference point. Additionally, the paper supported loss aversion with the endowment effect theory and status quo bias theory. Loss aversion was popular in explaining many phenomena in traditional choice theory. In 1980, loss aversion was used in Thaler (1980) regarding endowment effect. Loss aversion was also used to support the status quo bias in 1988, and the equity premium puzzle in 1995. In the 2000s, behavioural finance was an area with frequent application of this theory, including on asset prices and individual stock returns.

== Application ==
In marketing, the use of trial periods and rebates tries to take advantage of the buyer's tendency to value the good more after the buyer incorporates it in the status quo. In past behavioral economics studies, users participate up until the threat of loss equals any incurred gains. Methods established by Botond Kőszegi and Matthew Rabin in experimental economics illustrates the role of expectation, wherein an individual's belief about an outcome can create an instance of loss aversion, whether or not a tangible change of state has occurred.

Whether a transaction is framed as a loss or as a gain is important to this calculation. The same change in price framed differently, for example as a $5 discount or as a $5 surcharge avoided, has a significant effect on consumer behavior. Although traditional economists consider this "endowment effect", and all other effects of loss aversion, to be completely irrational, it is important to the fields of marketing and behavioral finance. Users in behavioral and experimental economics studies decided to cease participation in iterative money-making games when the threat of loss was close to the expenditure of effort, even when the user stood to further their gains. Loss aversion coupled with myopia has been shown to explain macroeconomic phenomena, such as the equity premium puzzle. Loss aversion to kinship is an explanation for aversion to inheritance tax.

== Prospect theory ==
Loss aversion is part of prospect theory, a cornerstone in behavioral economics. The theory explored numerous behavioral biases leading to sub-optimal decision making. Kahneman and Tversky found that people are biased in their real estimation of probability of events happening. They tend to over-weight both low and high probabilities and under-weight medium probabilities.

One example is which option is more attractive between option A ($1,500 with a probability of 33%, $1,400 with a probability of 66%, and $0 with a probability of 1%) and option B (a guaranteed $920). Prospect theory and loss aversion suggests that most people would choose option B as they prefer the guaranteed $920 since there is a probability of winning $0, even though it is only 1%. This demonstrates that people think in terms of expected utility relative to a reference point (i.e. current wealth) as opposed to absolute payoffs. When choices are framed as risky (i.e. risk losing 1 out of 10 lives vs the opportunity to save 9 out of 10 lives), individuals tend to be loss-averse as they weigh losses more heavily than comparable gains.

== Endowment effect ==
Loss aversion was first proposed as an explanation for the endowment effect—the fact that people place a higher value on a good that they own than on an identical good that they do not own—by Kahneman, Knetsch, and Thaler (1990). Loss aversion and the endowment effect lead to a violation of the Coase theorem—that "the allocation of resources will be independent of the assignment of property rights when costless trades are possible".

In several studies, the authors demonstrated that the endowment effect could be explained by loss aversion but not five alternatives, namely transaction costs, misunderstandings, habitual bargaining behaviors, income effects, and trophy effects. In each experiment, half of the subjects were randomly assigned a good and asked for the minimum amount they would be willing to sell it for while the other half of the subjects were given nothing and asked for the maximum amount they would be willing to spend to buy the good. Since the value of the good is fixed and individual valuation of the good varies from this fixed value only due to sampling variation, the supply and demand curves should be perfect mirrors of each other and thus half the goods should be traded. The authors also ruled out the explanation that lack of experience with trading would lead to the endowment effect by conducting repeated markets.

The first two alternative explanation are that under-trading was due to transaction costs or misunderstanding—were tested by comparing goods markets to induced-value markets under the same rules. If it was possible to trade to the optimal level in induced value markets, under the same rules, there should be no difference in goods markets. The results showed drastic differences between induced-value markets and goods markets. The median prices of buyers and sellers in induced-value markets matched almost every time leading to near perfect market efficiency, but goods markets sellers had much higher selling prices than buyers' buying prices. This effect was consistent over trials, indicating that this was not due to inexperience with the procedure or the market. Since the transaction cost that could have been due to the procedure was equal in the induced-value and goods markets, transaction costs were eliminated as an explanation for the endowment effect.

The third alternative explanation was that people have habitual bargaining behaviors, such as overstating their minimum selling price or understating their maximum bargaining price, that may spill over from strategic interactions where these behaviors are useful to the laboratory setting where they are sub-optimal. An experiment was conducted to address this by having the clearing prices selected at random. Buyers who indicated a willingness-to-pay (WTP) higher than the randomly drawn price got the good, and vice versa for those who indicated a lower WTP. Likewise, sellers who indicated a lower willingness-to-accept than the randomly drawn price sold the good and vice versa. This incentive compatible value elicitation method did not eliminate the endowment effect but did rule out habitual bargaining behavior as an alternative explanation.

Income effects were ruled out by giving one third of the participants mugs, one third chocolates, and one third neither mug nor chocolate. They were then given the option of trading the mug for the chocolate or vice versa and those with neither were asked to merely choose between mug and chocolate. Thus, wealth effects were controlled for those groups who received mugs and chocolate. The results showed that 86% of those starting with mugs chose mugs, 10% of those starting with chocolates chose mugs, and 56% of those with nothing chose mugs. This ruled out income effects as an explanation for the endowment effect. Also, since all participants in the group had the same good, it could not be considered a "trophy", eliminating the final alternative explanation. Thus, the five alternative explanations were eliminated, the first two through induced-value market vs. consumption goods market, the third with incentive compatible value elicitation procedure, and the fourth and fifth through a choice between endowed or alternative good.

== Criticisms ==
Multiple studies have questioned the existence of loss aversion. In several studies examining the effect of losses in decision-making, no loss aversion was found under risk and uncertainty. There are several explanations for these findings: one is that loss aversion does not exist in small payoff magnitudes (called magnitude dependent loss aversion by Mukherjee et al.(2017); which seems to hold true for time as well. The other is that the generality of the loss aversion pattern is lower than previously thought. David Gal (2006) argued that many of the phenomena commonly attributed to loss aversion, including the status quo bias, the endowment effect, and the preference for safe over risky options, are more parsimoniously explained by psychological inertia than by a loss/gain asymmetry. Gal and Rucker (2018) made similar arguments. Mkrva, Johnson, Gächter, and Herrmann (2019) cast doubt on these critiques, replicating loss aversion in five unique samples while also showing how the magnitude of loss aversion varies in theoretically predictable ways.

Loss aversion may be more salient when people compete. Gill and Prowse (2012) provide experimental evidence that people are loss averse around reference points given by their expectations in a competitive environment with real effort. Losses may also have an effect on attention but not on the weighting of outcomes; losses lead to more autonomic arousal than gains even in the absence of loss aversion. This latter effect is sometimes known as Loss Attention.

== Loss attention as alternative ==
Loss attention refers to the tendency of individuals to allocate more attention to a task or situation when it involve losses than when it does not involve losses. What distinguishes loss attention from loss aversion is that it does not imply that losses are given more subjective weight (or utility) than gains. Moreover, under loss aversion losses have a biasing effect whereas under loss attention they can have a debiasing effect. Loss attention was proposed as a distinct regularity from loss aversion by Eldad Yechiam and Guy Hochman.

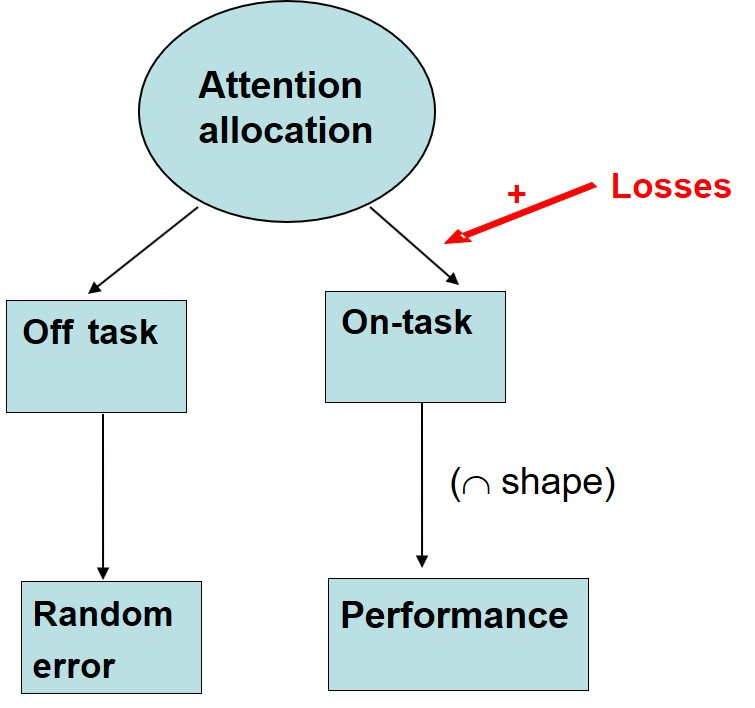
Figure 2 shows the effect of losses on the allocation of attention according to the loss attention account.

Specifically, the effect of losses is assumed to be on general attention rather than plain visual or auditory attention. The loss attention account assumes that losses in a given task mainly increase the general attentional resource pool available for that task. The increase in attention is assumed to have an inverse-U shape effect on performance (following the so called Yerkes-Dodson law). The inverse U-shaped effect implies that the effect of losses on performance is most apparent in settings where task attention is low to begin with, for example in a monotonous vigilance task or when a concurrent task is more appealing. Indeed, it was found that the positive effect of losses on performance in a given task was more pronounced in a task performed concurrently with another task which was primary in its importance.

Loss attention is consistent with several empirical findings in economics, finance, marketing, and decision making. Some of these effects have been previously attributed to loss aversion, but can be explained by a mere attention asymmetry between gains and losses. An example is the performance advantage attributed to golf rounds where a player is under par (or in a disadvantage) compared to other rounds where a player is at an advantage. Clearly, the difference could be attributed to increased attention in the former type of rounds. 2010s studies suggested that loss aversion mostly occur for very large losses, although the exact boundaries of the effect are unclear. On the other hand, loss attention was found even for small payoffs, such as $1. This suggests that loss attention may be more robust than loss aversion. Still, one might argue that loss aversion is more parsimonious than loss attention.

=== Additional phenomena explained by loss attention ===
- Increased expected value maximization with losses – It was found that individuals are more likely to select choice options with higher expected value (namely, mean outcome) in tasks where outcomes are framed as losses than when they are framed as gains. Yechiam and Hochman found that this effect occurred even when the alternative producing higher expected value was the one that included minor losses. Namely, a highly advantageous alternative producing minor losses was more attractive compared when it did not produce losses. Therefore, paradoxically, in their study minor losses led to more selection from the alternative generating them (refuting an explanation of this phenomenon based on loss aversion).
- Loss arousal – Individuals were found to display greater Autonomic Nervous System activation following losses than following equivalent gains. For example, pupil diameter and heart rate were found to increase following both gains and losses, but the size of the increase was higher following losses. Importantly, this was found even for small losses and gains where individuals do not show loss aversion. Similarly, a positive effect of losses compared to equivalent gains was found on activation of midfrontal cortical networks 200 to 400 milliseconds after observing the outcome. This effect as well was found in the absence of loss aversion.
- Increased hot stove effect for losses – The hot stove effect is the finding that individuals avoid a risky alternative when the available information is limited to the obtained payoffs. A relevant example (proposed by Mark Twain) is of a cat which jumped on a hot stove and will never do it again, even when the stove is cold and potentially contains food. In a finding that is consistent with the notion that losses increase attention, when a given option produces losses, this increases the hot stove effect.
- Out of pocket phenomenon – In financial decision making, it has been shown that people are more motivated when their incentives are to avoid losing personal resources, as opposed to gaining equivalent resources. Traditionally, this strong behavioral tendency was explained by loss aversion; however, it could also be explained simply as increased attention.
- Allure of minor disadvantages – In marketing studies, it has been demonstrated that products whose minor negative features are highlighted (in addition to positive features) are perceived as more attractive. Similarly, messages discussing both the advantages and disadvantages of a product were found to be more convincing than one-sided messages. Loss attention explains this as due to attentional competition between options, and increased attention following the highlighting of small negatives, which can increase the attractiveness of a product or a candidate either due to exposure or learning.

== Evolutionary psychology ==
Two types of explanations have been proposed for loss aversion. First, loss aversion may arise because downside risks are more threatening to survival than upside opportunities. Humans are theorized to be hardwired for loss aversion due to asymmetric evolutionary pressure on losses and gains: "for an organism operating close to the edge of survival, the loss of a day's food could cause death, whereas the gain of an extra day's food would not cause an extra day of life (unless the food could be easily and effectively stored)". This explanation has been proposed by Kahneman himself: "Organisms that treat threats as more urgent than opportunities have a better chance to survive and reproduce."

It has also been proposed that loss aversion may be a useful feature of cognition by keeping aspirations around the level of achievement within our reach. From this perspective, loss aversion prevents us from setting aspirations that are too high and unrealistic. If we set aspirations too high, loss aversion increases the subjective pain of failing to reach them. Loss aversion complements the existence of anticipatory utility, which encourages us not to set aspirations that are too low.

=== In nonhuman subjects ===
In 2005, experiments were conducted on the ability of capuchin monkeys to use money. After several months of training, the monkeys began showing behavior considered to reflect understanding of the concept of a medium of exchange. They exhibited the same propensity to avoid perceived losses demonstrated by human subjects and investors. Chen, Lakshminarayanan and Santos (2006) also conducted experiments on capuchin monkeys to determine whether behavioral biases extend across species. In one of their experiments, subjects were presented with two choices that both delivered an identical payoff of one apple piece in exchange of their coins. Experimenter 1 displayed one apple piece and gave that exact amount. Experimenter 2 displayed two apple pieces initially but always removed one piece before delivering the remaining apple piece to the subject. Therefore, identical payoffs are yielded regardless of which experimenter the subject traded with. It was found that subjects strongly preferred the experimenter who initially displayed only one apple piece, even though both experimenters yielded the same outcome of one apple piece. This study suggests that capuchins weighted losses more heavily than equivalent gains.

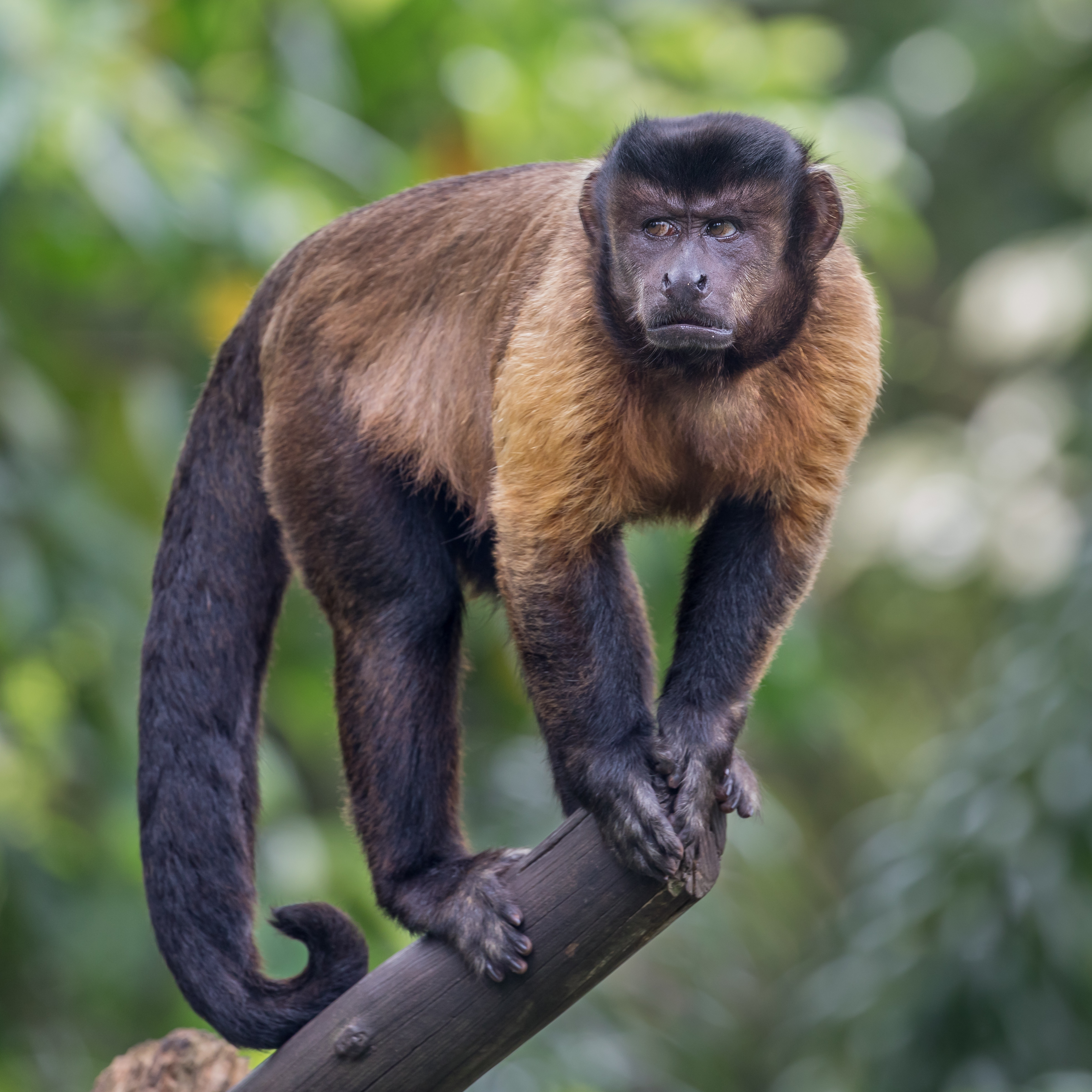
Tufted capuchin monkey display human-like behavioral biases, including loss aversion.

== Expectation-based ==
Expectation-based loss aversion is a phenomenon in behavioral economics. When the expectations of an individual fail to match reality, they lose an amount of utility from the lack of experiencing fulfillment of these expectations. Analytical framework by Botond Kőszegi and Matthew Rabin provides a methodology through which such behavior can be classified and even predicted. An individual's most recent expectations influences loss aversion in outcomes outside the status quo; a shopper intending to buy a pair of shoes on sale experiences loss aversion when the pair they had intended to buy is no longer available.

Subsequent research performed by Johannes Abeler, Armin Falk, Lorenz Goette, and David Huffman in conjunction with the Institute of Labor Economics used the framework of Kőszegi and Rabin to prove that people experience expectation-based loss aversion at multiple thresholds. The study evinced that reference points of people causes a tendency to avoid expectations going unmet. Participants were asked to participate in an iterative money-making task given the possibilities that they would receive either an accumulated sum for each round of "work", or a predetermined amount of money. With a 50% chance of receiving the "fair" compensation, participants were more likely to quit the experiment as this amount approached the fixed payment. They chose to stop when the values were equal as no matter which random result they received, their expectations would be matched. Participants were reluctant to work for more than the fixed payment as there was an equal chance their expected compensation would not be met.

== Within education ==
Loss aversion experimentation has most recently been applied within an educational setting in an effort to improve achievement within the U.S. In this latest experiment, Fryer et al. posits framing merit pay in terms of a loss in order to be most effective. This study was performed in the city of Chicago Heights within nine K-8 urban schools, which included 3,200 students. 150 out of 160 eligible teachers participated and were assigned to one of four treatment groups or a control group. Teachers in the incentive groups received rewards based on their students' end of the year performance on the ThinkLink Predictive Assessment and K-2 students took the Iowa Test of Basic Skills (ITBS). The control group followed the traditional merit pay process of receiving "bonus pay" at the end of the year based on student performance on standardized exams. The experimental groups received a lump sum given at beginning of the year, that would have to be paid back. The bonus was equivalent to approximately 8% of the average teacher salary in Chicago Heights, approximately $8,000. According to the authors, 'this suggests that there may be significant potential for exploiting loss aversion in the pursuit of both optimal public policy and the pursuit of profits'. Thomas Amadio, superintendent of Chicago Heights Elementary School District 170, where the experiment was conducted, stated that "the study shows the value of merit pay as an encouragement for better teacher performance".

== Neural aspect ==
In earlier studies, both bidirectional mesolimbic responses of activation for gains and deactivation for losses (or vice versa) and gain or loss-specific responses have been seen. While reward anticipation is associated with ventral striatum activation, negative outcome anticipation engages the amygdala. Only some studies have shown involvement of amygdala during negative outcome anticipation but not others, which has led to some inconsistencies. It has later been proven that inconsistencies may only have been due to methodological issues including the utilisation of different tasks and stimuli, coupled with ranges of potential gains or losses sampled from either payoff matrices rather than parametric designs, and most of the data are reported in groups, therefore ignoring the variability amongst individuals. Rather than focusing on subjects in groups, later studies focus more on individual differences in the neural bases by jointly looking at behavioural analyses and neuroimaging

Neuroimaging studies on loss aversion involves measuring brain activity with functional magnetic resonance imaging (fMRI) to investigate whether individual variability in loss aversion were reflected in differences in brain activity through bidirectional or gain or loss specific responses, as well as multivariate source-based morphometry (SBM) to investigate a structural network of loss aversion and univariate voxel-based morphometry (VBM) to identify specific functional regions within this network.

Brain activity in a right ventral striatum cluster increases particularly when anticipating gains. This involves the ventral caudate nucleus, pallidum, putamen, bilateral orbitofrontal cortex, superior frontal and middle gyri, posterior cingulate cortex, dorsal anterior cingulate cortex, and parts of the dorsomedial thalamus connecting to temporal and prefrontal cortex. There is a significant correlation between degree of loss aversion and strength of activity in both the frontomedial cortex and the ventral striatum. This is shown by the slope of brain activity deactivation for increasing losses being significantly greater than the slope of activation for increasing gains in the appetitive system involving the ventral striatum in the network of reward-based behavioural learning. On the other hand, when anticipating loss, the central and basal nuclei of amygdala, right posterior insula extending into the supramarginal gyrus mediate the output to other structures involved in the expression of fear and anxiety, such as the right parietal operculum and supramarginal gyrus. Consistent with gain anticipation, the slope of the activation for increasing losses was significantly greater than the slope of the deactivation for increasing gains.

Multiple neural mechanisms are recruited when making choices, to demonstrate functional and structural individual variability. Biased anticipation of negative outcomes leading to loss aversion involves specific somatosensory and limbic structures. fMRI test measuring neural responses in striatal, limbic and somatosensory brain regions help track individual differences in loss aversion. Its limbic component involved the amygdala (associated with negative emotion and plays a role in the expression of fear) and putamen in the right hemisphere. The somatosensory component included the middle cingulate cortex, as well as the posterior insula and rolandic operculum bilaterally. The latter cluster partially overlaps with the right hemispheric one displaying the loss-oriented bidirectional response previously described, but unlike that region, it mostly involved the posterior insula bilaterally. All these structures play a critical role in detecting threats and prepare the organism for appropriate action, with the connections between amygdala nuclei and the striatum controlling the avoidance of aversive events. There are functional differences between the right and left amygdala. Overall, the role of amygdala in loss anticipation suggested that loss aversion may reflect a Pavlovian conditioned approach-avoidance response. Therefore, there is a direct link between individual differences in the structural properties of this network and the actual consequences of its associated behavioral defense responses. The neural activity involved in the processing of aversive experience and stimuli is not just a result of a temporary fearful overreaction prompted by choice-related information, but rather a stable component of one's own preference function, reflecting a specific pattern of neural activity encoded in the functional and structural construction of a limbic-somatosensory neural system anticipating heightened aversive state of the brain. Even when no choice is required, individual differences in the intrinsic responsiveness of this interoceptive system reflect the impact of anticipated negative effects on evaluative processes, leading preference for avoiding losses rather than acquiring greater but riskier gains.

Individual differences in loss aversion are related to variables such as age, gender, and genetic factors, all of which affect thalamic norepinephrine transmission, as well as neural structure and activities. Outcome anticipation and ensuing loss aversion involve multiple neural systems, showing functional and structural individual variability directly related to the actual outcomes of choices. In a study, adolescents and adults are found to be similarly loss-averse on behavioural level but they demonstrated different underlying neural responses to the process of rejecting gambles. Although adolescents rejected the same proportion of trials as adults, adolescents displayed greater caudate and frontal pole activation than adults to achieve this. These findings suggest a difference in neural development during the avoidance of risk. It is possible that adding affectively arousing factors (e.g. peer influences) may overwhelm the reward-sensitive regions of the adolescent decision making system leading to risk-seeking behaviour. On the other hand, although men and women did not differ on their behavioural task performance, men showed greater neural activation than women in various areas during the task. Loss of striatal dopamine neurons is associated with reduced risk-taking behaviour. Acute administration of D2 dopamine agonists may cause an increase in risky choices in humans. This suggests dopamine acting on stratum and possibly other mesolimbic structures can modulate loss aversion by reducing loss prediction signalling.

== See also ==
- Equity premium puzzle
- Escalation of commitment
- List of cognitive biases
- Prospect theory
- Revanchism
- Risk aversion
- Status quo bias
- Sunk cost fallacy

== Sources ==
- Ert, E.; Erev, I. (2008). "The rejection of attractive gambles, loss aversion, and the lemon avoidance heuristic". Journal of Economic Psychology. 29 (5): 715–723. doi:10.1016/j.joep.2007.06.003.
- Erev, I.; Ert, E.; Yechiam, E. (2008). "Loss aversion, diminishing sensitivity, and the effect of experience on repeated decisions". Journal of Behavioral Decision Making. 21 (5): 575–597. doi:10.1002/bdm.602. S2CID 143592144.
- Gal, D. (2006). "A psychological law of inertia and the illusion of loss aversion". Judgment and Decision Making. 1 (1): 23–32. doi:10.1017/S1930297500000322.
- Harinck, F.; Van Dijk, E.; Van Beest, I.; Mersmann, P. (2007). "When gains loom larger than losses: Reversed loss aversion for small amounts of money". Psychological Science. 18 (12): 1099–1105. doi:10.1111/j.1467-9280.2007.02031.x. PMID 18031418. S2CID 26981722.
- Hochman, G.; Yechiam, E. (2011). "Loss aversion in the eye and in the heart: The Autonomic Nervous System's responses to losses". Journal of Behavioral Decision Making. 24 (2): 140–156. doi:10.1002/bdm.692.
- Kahneman, D.; Knetsch, J.; Thaler, R. (1990). "Experimental Test of the endowment effect and the Coase Theorem". Journal of Political Economy. 98 (6): 1325–1348. doi:10.1086/261737. JSTOR 2937761. S2CID 154889372.
- Kahneman, D.; Tversky, A. (1979). "Prospect Theory: An Analysis of Decision under Risk". Econometrica. 47 (2): 263–291. doi:10.2307/1914185. JSTOR 1914185.
- Kermer, D. A.; Driver-Linn, E.; Wilson, T. D.; Gilbert, D. T. (2006). "Loss aversion is an affective forecasting error". Psychological Science. 17 (8): 649–653. doi:10.1111/j.1467-9280.2006.01760.x. PMID 16913944. S2CID 1331820.
- McGraw, A. P.; Larsen, J. T.; Kahneman, D.; Schkade, D. (2010). "Comparing gains and losses". Psychological Science. 21 (10): 1438–1445. doi:10.1177/0956797610381504. PMID 20739673. S2CID 2290585.
- Nicolau, J. L. (2012). "Battle Royal: Zero-price effect vs relative vs referent thinking". Marketing Letters. 23 (3): 661–669. doi:10.1007/s11002-012-9169-2. hdl:10919/120804. S2CID 143589145.
- Silberberg, A.; et al. (2008). "On loss aversion in capuchin monkeys". Journal of the Experimental Analysis of Behavior. 89 (2): 145–155. doi:10.1901/jeab.2008.89-145. PMC 2251327. PMID 18422015.
- Tversky, A.; Kahneman, D. (1991). "Loss Aversion in Riskless Choice: A Reference Dependent Model". Quarterly Journal of Economics. 106 (4): 1039–1061. doi:10.2307/2937956. JSTOR 2937956.
- Yechiam, E.; Hochman, G. (2013). "Losses as modulators of attention: Review and analysis of the unique effects of losses over gains". Psychological Bulletin. 139 (2): 497–518. doi:10.1037/a0029383. PMID 22823738. S2CID 10521233.
- Yechiam, E.; Telpaz, A. (2013). "Losses Induce Consistency in Risk Taking Even Without Loss Aversion". Journal of Behavioral Decision Making. 26 (1): 31–40. doi:10.1002/bdm.758.
- Canessa, Nicola; Crespi, Chiara; Baud-Bovy, Gabriel; Dodich, Alessandra; Falini, Andrea; Antonellis, Giulia; Cappa, Stefano F. (2017). "Neural markers of loss aversion in resting-state brain activity". NeuroImage. 146: 257–265. doi:10.1016/j.neuroimage.2016.11.050. PMID 27884798. S2CID 3396784.
- Barkley-Levenson, Emily E.; Van Leijenhorst, Linda; Galván, Adriana (2013). "Behavioral and neural correlates of loss aversion and risk avoidance in adolescents and adults". Developmental Cognitive Neuroscience. 3: 72–83. doi:10.1016/j.dcn.2012.09.007. PMC 6987718. PMID 23245222.
