= Endowment effect =

Cognitive bias

In psychology and behavioral economics, the endowment effect, also known as divestiture aversion, is the finding that people are more likely to retain an object they own than acquire that same object when they do not own it. The endowment theory can be defined as "an application of prospect theory positing that loss aversion associated with ownership explains observed exchange asymmetries."

This is typically illustrated in two ways. In a valuation paradigm, people's maximum willingness to pay (WTP) to acquire an object is typically lower than the least amount they are willing to accept (WTA) to give up that same object when they own it—even when there is no cause for attachment, or even if the item was only obtained minutes ago. In an exchange paradigm, people given a good are reluctant to trade it for another good of similar value. For example, participants first given a pen of equal expected value to that of a coffee mug were generally unwilling to trade, whilst participants first given the coffee mug were also unwilling to trade it for the pen.

A more controversial third paradigm used to elicit the endowment effect is the mere ownership paradigm, primarily used in experiments in psychology, marketing, and organizational behavior. In this paradigm, people who are randomly assigned to receive a good ("owners") evaluate it more positively than people who are not randomly assigned to receive the good ("controls"). The distinction between this paradigm and the first two is that it is not incentive-compatible. In other words, participants are not explicitly incentivized to reveal the extent to which they truly like or value the good.

The endowment effect can be equated to the behavioural model willingness to accept or pay (WTAP), a formula sometimes used to find out how much a consumer or person is willing to put up with or lose for different outcomes. However, this model has come under recent criticism as potentially inaccurate.

== Examples ==
One of the most famous examples of the endowment effect in the literature is from a study by Daniel Kahneman, Jack Knetsch & Richard Thaler, in which Cornell University undergraduates were given a mug and then offered the chance to sell it or trade it for an equally valued alternative (pens). They found that the amount participants required as compensation for the mug once their ownership of the mug had been established ("willingness to accept") was approximately twice as high as the amount they were willing to pay to acquire the mug ("willingness to pay").

Other examples of the endowment effect include work by Ziv Carmon and Dan Ariely, who found that participants' hypothetical selling price (willingness to accept or WTA) for NCAA final four tournament tickets were 14 times higher than their hypothetical buying price (willingness to pay or WTP). Also, work by Hossain and List (Working Paper) discussed in the Economist in 2010, showed that workers worked harder to maintain ownership of a provisionally awarded bonus than they did for a bonus framed as a potential yet-to-be-awarded gain. In addition to these examples, the endowment effect has been observed using different goods in a wide range of different populations, including children, great apes, and new world monkeys.

== Background ==
The endowment effect has been observed from ancient times:

For most things are differently valued by those who have them and by those who wish to get them: what belongs to us, and what we give away, always seems very precious to us.

— Aristotle, The Nicomachean Ethics book IX (F. H. Peters translation)

Psychologists first noted the difference between consumers' WTP and WTA as early as the 1960s. The term endowment effect however was first explicitly coined in 1980 by the economist Richard Thaler in reference to the under-weighting of opportunity costs as well as the inertia introduced into a consumer's choice processes when goods included in their endowment become more highly valued than goods that are not.

At the time Thaler's conceptualisation of the endowment effect was in direct contrast to that of accepted economic theory, which assumed humans were completely rational when making decisions. Through his contrasting viewpoint, Thaler was able to offer a clearer understanding of how humans make economic decisions. In the years that followed, extensive investigations into the endowment effect have been conducted producing a wealth of interesting empirical and theoretical findings.

== Theoretical explanations ==
=== Loss aversion ===
The leading explanation for the aforementioned WTP-WTA gap is that of loss aversion. It was first linked by Kahneman and his colleagues that selling an endowment means the loss of the object, and as humans are aligned to be more loss-averse, less utility is obtained from acquirement of the same endowment. They go on to suggest that the endowment effect, when considered as a facet of loss-aversion, would thus violate the Coase theorem, and was described as inconsistent with standard economic theory which asserts that a person's willingness to pay (WTP) for a good should be equal to their willingness to accept (WTA) compensation to be deprived of the good, a hypothesis which underlies consumer theory and indifference curves. Another aspect of loss aversion exhibited within the endowment effect is that opportunity costs are often undervalued. The overcharging of the selling item stems from the fixation of losing the item rather than the unattained gain if the sale falls through.

The correlation between the two theories is so high that the endowment effect is often seen as the presentation of loss aversion in a riskless setting. However, these claims have been disputed and other researchers claim that psychological inertia, differences in reference prices relied on by buyers and sellers, and ownership (attribution of the item to self) and not loss aversion are the key to this phenomenon.

=== Psychological inertia ===
David Gal proposed a psychological inertia account of the endowment effect. In this account, sellers require a higher price to part with an object than buyers are willing to pay because neither has a well-defined, precise valuation for the object and therefore there is a range of prices over which neither buyers nor sellers have much incentive to trade. For example, in the case of Kahneman et al.'s (1990) classic mug experiments (where sellers demanded about $7 to part with their mug whereas buyers were only willing to pay, on average, about $3 to acquire a mug) there was likely a range of prices for the mug ($4 to $6) that left the buyers and sellers without much incentive to either acquire or part with it. Buyers and sellers therefore maintained the status quo out of inertia. Conversely, a high price ($7 or more) yielded a meaningful incentive for an owner to part with the mug; likewise, a relatively low price ($3 or less) yielded a meaningful incentive for a buyer to acquire the mug.

=== Reference-dependent accounts ===
According to reference-dependent theories, consumers first evaluate the potential change in question as either being a gain or a loss. In line with prospect theory (Tversky and Kahneman, 1979), changes that are framed as losses are weighed more heavily than are the changes framed as gains. Thus an individual owning "A" amount of a good, asked how much he/she would be willing to pay to acquire "B", would be willing to pay a value (B-A) that is lower than the value that he/she would be willing to accept to sell (C-A) units; the value function for perceived gains is not as steep as the value function for perceived losses.

Figure 1 presents this explanation in graphical form. An individual at point A, asked how much he/she would be willing to accept (WTA) as compensation to sell X units and move to point C, would demand greater compensation for that loss than he/she would be willing to pay for an equivalent gain of X units to move him/her to point B. Thus the difference between (B-A) and (C-A) would account for the endowment effect. In other words, he/she expects more money while selling; but wants to pay less while buying the same amount of goods.

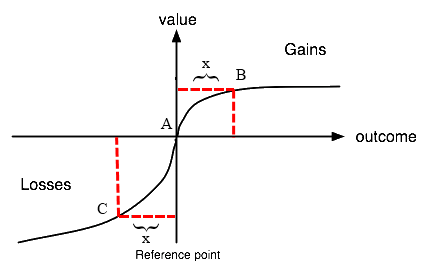
Figure 1: Prospect Theory and the Endowment Effect

=== Neoclassical explanations ===
Hanemann (1991), develops a neoclassical explanation for the endowment effect, accounting for the effect without invoking prospect theory.

Figure 2 presents this explanation in graphical form. In the figure, two indifference curves for a particular good X and wealth are given. Consider an individual who is given goods X such that they move from point A (where they have X_{0} of good X) to point B (where they have the same wealth and X_{1} of good X). Their WTP represented by the vertical distance from B to C, because (after giving up that amount of wealth) the individual is indifferent about being at A or C. Now consider an individual who gives up goods such that they move from B to A. Their WTA represented by the (larger) vertical distance from A to D because (after receiving that much wealth) they are indifferent about either being at point B or D. Shogren et al. (1994) has reported findings that lend support to Hanemann's hypothesis. However, Kahneman, Knetsch, and Thaler (1991) find that the endowment effect continues even when wealth effects are fully controlled for.

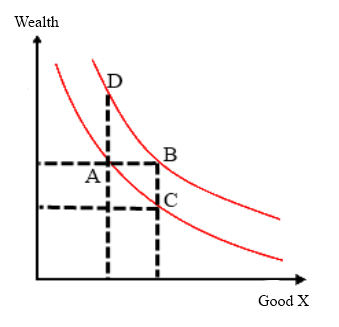
Figure 2: Hanemann's Endowment Effect Explanation

When goods are indivisible, a coalitional game can be set up so that a utility function can be defined on all subsets of the goods. Hu (2020) shows the endowment effect when the utility function is superadditive, i.e., the value of the whole is greater than the sum of its parts. Hu (2020) also introduces a few unbiased solutions which mitigate endowment bias.

Experiments in cognitive psychology have demonstrated that the endowment effect can be brought about by asymmetries in cognitive processing in judging owned and not-owned goods. A 2007 fMRI study by Knutson et al. demonstrated that the insula, an area of the brain associated with loss aversion, is stimulated when people ponder relinquishing goods they already possess. This is consistent with the hypothesis that the endowment effect entails not only ownership bias but also emotional attachment and loss anticipation neural processes. Further, the effect is also conditioned by cultural environment and personality difference in risk sensitivity.

=== Connection-based, or "psychological ownership" theories ===
Connection-based theories propose that the attachment or association with the self-induced by owning a good is responsible for the endowment effect (for a review, see Morewedge & Giblin, 2015). Work by Morewedge, Shu, Gilbert and Wilson (2009) provides support for these theories, as does work by Maddux et al. (2010). For example, research participants who were given one mug and asked how much they would pay for a second mug ("owner-buyers") were WTP as much as "owners-sellers," another group of participants who were given a mug and asked how much they were WTA to sell it (both groups valued the mug in question more than buyers who were not given a mug). Others have argued that the short duration of ownership or highly prosaic items typically used in endowment effect type studies is not sufficient to produce such a connection, conducting research demonstrating support for those points (e.g. Liersch & Rottenstreich, Working Paper).

Two paths by which attachment or self-associations increase the value of a good have been proposed (Morewedge & Giblin, 2015). An attachment theory suggests that ownership creates a non-transferable balanced association between the self and the good. The good is incorporated into the self-concept of the owner, becoming part of her identity and imbuing it with attributes related to her self-concept. Self-associations may take the form of an emotional attachment to the good. Once an attachment has formed, the potential loss of the good is perceived as a threat to the self. A real-world example of this would be an individual refusing to part with a college T-shirt because it supports one's identity as an alumnus of that university. A second route by which ownership may increase value is through a self-referential memory effect (SRE) – the better encoding and recollection of stimuli associated with the self-concept. People have a better memory for goods they own than goods they do not own. The self-referential memory effect for owned goods may act thus as an endogenous framing effect. During a transaction, attributes of a good may be more accessible to its owners than are other attributes of the transaction. Because most goods have more positive than negative features, this accessibility bias should result in owners more positively evaluating their goods than do non-owners.

=== Greater sensitivity to market demands for sellers ===
Sellers may dictate a price based on the desires of multiple potential buyers, whereas buyers may consider their own taste. This can lead to differences between buying and selling prices because the market price is typically higher than one's idiosyncratic price estimate. According to this account, the endowment effect can be viewed as under-pricing for buyers compared to the market price; or over-pricing for sellers compared to their individual taste. Two recent lines of study support this argument. Weaver and Frederick (2012) presented their participants with retail prices of products, and then asked them to specify either their buying or selling price for these products. The results revealed that sellers' valuations were closer to the known retail prices than those of buyers. A second line of studies is a meta-analysis of buying and selling of lotteries. A review of over 30 empirical studies showed that selling prices were closer to the lottery's expected value, which is the normative price of the lottery: hence the endowment effect was consistent with buyers' tendency to under-price lotteries as compared to the normative price. One possible reason for this tendency of buyers to indicate lower prices is their risk aversion. By contrast, sellers may assume that the market is heterogeneous enough to include buyers with potential risk neutrality and therefore adjust their price closer to a risk neutral expected value.

=== Biased information processing theories ===
Several cognitive accounts of the endowment effect suggest that it is induced by the way endowment status changes the search for, attention to, recollection of, and weighting of information regarding the transaction. Frames evoked by acquisition of a good (e.g., buying, choosing it rather than another good) may increase the cognitive accessibility of information favoring the decision to keep one's money and not acquire the good. By contrast, frames evoked by disposition of the good (e.g., selling) may increase the cognitive accessibility of information favoring the decision to keep the good rather than trade or dispose of it for money (for a review, see Morewedge & Giblin, 2015). For example, Johnson and colleagues (2007) found that prospective mug buyers tended to recall reasons to keep their money before recalling reasons to buy the mug, whereas sellers tended to recall reasons to keep their mug before reasons to sell it for money.

=== Evolutionary arguments ===
Jones (2001) proposed that the endowment effect is an evolved predisposition—one that natural selection favored through most of our species' evolutionary history, though it sometimes appears irrational in modern society. This proposal generated three predictions, each of which has been supported by subsequent findings: (1) other primates exhibit endowment effects (Brosnan et al., 2007; Kanngiesser et al., 2011; Flemming et al., 2012; Drayton et al., 2013); (2) the prevalence and size of the effect for a specific item tends to be greater in circumstances where that item is relevant to evolutionary fitness (Brosnan et al., 2012); and (3) the prevalence and size of the effect tends to be greater for categories of items that are more relevant to evolutionary fitness, both among primates (Brosnan et al., 2007) and humans (Jaeger et al., 2020). With respect to humans, one study found that evolutionary salience predicted more than half of the variance in the magnitudes of endowment effects across a large, novel set of items (Jaeger et al., 2020).

Huck, Kirchsteiger & Oechssler (2005) have also raised an evolutionary hypothesis—namely, that natural selection may favor individuals whose preferences embody an endowment effect given that it may improve one's bargaining position in bilateral trades. Thus in a small tribal society with a few alternative sellers (i.e. where the buyer may not have the option of moving to an alternative seller), having a predisposition towards embodying the endowment effect may be evolutionarily beneficial. This may be linked with findings (Shogren, et al., 1994) that suggest the endowment effect is less strong when the relatively artificial sense of scarcity induced in experimental settings is lessened. Countervailing evidence for an evolutionary account is provided by studies showing that the endowment effect is moderated by exposure to modern exchange markets (e.g., hunter gatherer tribes with market exposure are more likely to exhibit the endowment effect than tribes that do not), and that the endowment effect is moderated by culture (Maddux et al., 2010).

== Criticisms ==
Some economists have questioned the effect's existence. Hanemann (1991) noted that economic theory only suggests that WTP and WTA should be equal for goods which are close substitutes, so observed differences in these measures for goods such as environmental resources and personal health can be explained without reference to an endowment effect. Shogren, et al. (1994) noted that the experimental technique used by Kahneman, Knetsch and Thaler (1990) to demonstrate the endowment effect created a situation of artificial scarcity. They performed a more robust experiment with the same goods used by Kahneman, Knetsch and Thaler (chocolate bars and mugs) and found little evidence of the endowment effect in substitutable goods, acknowledging the endowment effect as valid for goods without substitutes—non-renewable Earth resources being an example of these. Others have argued that the use of hypothetical questions and experiments involving small amounts of money tells us little about actual behavior (e.g. Hoffman and Spitzer, 1993, p. 69, n. 23) with some research supporting these points (e.g., Kahneman, Knetsch and Thaler, 1990, Harless, 1989) and others not (e.g. Knez, Smith and Williams, 1985). More recently, Plott and Zeiler have challenged the endowment effect theory by arguing that observed disparities between WTA and WTP measures are not reflective of human preferences, but rather such disparities stem from faulty experimental designs.

== Implications ==
Implications regarding the endowment effect are present at both the individual and corporate level. Its presence can cause market inefficiencies and value irregularities between buyers and sellers with similar consequences at smaller or upscaled transactions.

=== Individual ===
Herbert Hovenkamp (1991) has argued that the presence of an endowment effect has significant implications for law and economics, particularly in regard to welfare economics. He argues that the presence of an endowment effect indicates that a person has no indifference curve (see however Hanemann, 1991) rendering the neoclassical tools of welfare analysis useless, concluding that courts should instead use WTA as a measure of value. Fischel (1995) however, raises the counterpoint that using WTA as a measure of value would deter the development of a nation's infrastructure and economic growth. The endowment effect changes the shape of the indifference curves substantially Similarly, another study that is focused on the Strategic Reallocations for Endowment analyses how it is the case that economics's agents welfare could potentially increase if they change their endowment holding.

Further to this, the endowment effect has been linked to both economic and psychological impacts of various scale. For example, often individuals refuse the sale of their house or upscale their expected value simply due to their emotional attachment and effort poured into it. This means they might either stick with a property which causes greater inconvenience to alternatives or have an increased level of difficulties associated with its sale. Either of these scenarios both negatively impact the relevant economy and the individual's mental welfare. Alternatively, if a buyer is subject to purchasing the item at the WTA level when it is set above market price, they are subject to overspending which positively impacts the economy whilst potentially reducing individual welfare yet again.

=== Business ===
In recent years the endowment effect has largely been leveraged within e-commerce. Businesses have expanded more rapidly than previous years through its effective integration into marketing products and services. Here consumers are often given a sense of ownership over what the business possesses thereby unlocking the cognitive bias.

==== Free trials ====
By offering free trials to select services, business not only expand the number of users reached, but during this trial period they also give consumers a sense of ownership. Consumer's psychological perception thus makes them more reluctant to part with the service when the trial ends, thereby increasing the quantity of subscribers.

==== Free return ====
This marketing strategy makes consumers more likely to purchase the product due to the perception of it being more endowing. However, once purchased, customers are less inclined to return it even if a level of dissatisfaction was experienced.

==== Haptic imagery ====
Various businesses offer a sense of ownership through showing customers what their product might look like in a relatable environment. Fashion and furniture businesses largely rely on haptic imagery to sell their products. While they do not necessarily offer customers to use their products they create an image of what could be, by either offering online viewing adjustments or appealing to ones sense of imagination. This feeling of ownership makes it harder for consumers to let go of the image and thus the product.

== See also ==
- Escalation of commitment
- Mere ownership effect
- Loss aversion
- Omission bias
- Behavioral economics
- List of cognitive biases
- Sunk costs
- Transaction cost
- IKEA effect
