= Kathryn Zeiler =

American law professor (born 1969)

- Born: June 3, 1969 (age 57)
- Education: Indiana University Bloomington; Golden Gate University; California Institute of Technology; University of Southern California Gould School of Law; California Institute of Technology
- Occupation: Law professor
- Employer: Boston University School of Law

Kathryn Marie Zeiler (born June 3, 1969) is the Nancy Barton Scholar and Professor of Law at Boston University School of Law. Zeiler's work primarily focuses on health law, torts law, law and economics, medical malpractice, and disclosure law.

== Biography ==
Zeiler graduated from: Indiana University School of Business in Bloomington with a B.S. in business in 1991; Golden Gate University with a M.S. in Taxation; and California Institute of Technology with a M.S. in Social Sciences in 2000. Zeiler then received her Juris Doctor from University of Southern California Gould School of Law in 2000 and her Doctor of Philosophy in Economics from California Institute of Technology in 2003. Zeiler served as a professor of law at Georgetown University Law Center. During her Fall 2010 sabbatical from Georgetown University Law Center, Zeiler participated in a senior fellowship at the Petrie-Flom Center of Health Law Policy, Biotechnology, and Bioethics at Harvard Law School. She was named the Nancy Barton Scholar and Professor of Law positions at Boston University School of Law in 2015 . Zeiler also previously held several visiting professorships at Harvard Law School, New York University School of Law, and Boston University School of Law.

== Scholarship ==
=== Behavioral economics ===
Zeiler and Charles R. Plott co-authored two articles in the American Economic Review re-examining the methodology used to establish the endowment effect theory: "The Willingness to Pay-Willingness to Accept Gap, the 'Endowment Effect,' Subject Misconceptions, and Experimental Procedures for Eliciting Valuations," (Cited 1137 times, according to Google Scholar) and “Exchange Asymmetries Incorrectly Interpreted as Evidence of Endowment Effect Theory and Prospect Theory” (Cited 364 times, according to Google Scholar.). While less than 10% of legal articles referencing the endowment effect theory cited to Zeiler and Plott's work in the five years following the 2005 article's publication, Zeiler and Plott's work is credited as being among the most prominent challengers to the endowment effect theory and has heavily influenced behavioralist scholarship.

The endowment effect theory has previously been called "one of the most robust findings in the psychology of decision making” and is used by behavioral legal scholars to explain the relationship between ownership and value. Zeiler and Plotts' findings challenged the endowment effect theory by arguing that observed disparities between willingness-to-accept (WTA) and willingness-to-pay (WTP) measures are not reflective of human preferences, but rather such disparities stem from encouraged experimental design practices within the field. By developing an elicitation procedure that controls subject misconceptions, Zeiler and Plott found that the endowment effect theory is not sufficient to explain WTA-WTP gaps that are likely the result of subject misconceptions. Since Plott and Zeiler's 2005 and 2007 experiments, a new wave of research has sought to address whether the endowment effect theory stems from reference-dependent preferences. Their findings have notably paved the way for refined and alternative theories regarding the endowment effect, including the Kőszegi-Rabin theory of expectations-based reference points, which explains the absence of the endowment effect in relation to misconceptions about expectations relating to trading probability.

Given the significance of these findings, Zeiler and Plotts' original conclusions have been met with some dispute. There had been speculations that the WTA-WTP gap may vary according to the commodity type (e.g. low-value consumption goods, high-value consumption goods, non-marketed goods, lotteries with goods as prizes, lotteries with money prizes). Critics of Zeiler and Plotts' work have found that while the lack of a WTA-WTP gap has continued to be observed in low cost commodities (like mugs), the WTA-WTP gap seems to persist in lottery systems, even when elicitation procedures attempt to control subject misconceptions. Therefore, these critics have argued in favor of "house money" effects, rather than subject misconceptions. However, in their 2011 reply to such criticisms, Zeiler and Plott (1) asserted that lottery data is contaminated by irrational choice and distorted beliefs that promote inconsistent risks and (2) argued that other literature does not support a "house money" conjecture. Since these contributions to the field of behavioral economics, Zeiler has continued to advocate for the adoption of more modern views on decision theories into standard law and economic models.

=== Medical malpractice ===
Zeiler has explored the differences between malpractice payments and jury verdicts, while also discussing the consequences of using malpractice insurance to satisfy malpractice claims. Her work indicates that malpractice awards rarely exceed primary coverage limits, regardless of the damages awarded by juries. Therefore, even though physicians without excess-layer liability coverage are in principle vulnerable to judgments above the standard liability insurance, this is almost never the case. Policy limits almost always limit the effect of larger jury verdicts where verdicts exceed available insurance coverage. Thus, regardless of their malpractice insurance coverage, doctors rarely make out-of-pocket payments to satisfy malpractice awards. In the rare cases in which large jury verdicts or settlements are paid out above general policy limits, these payments are almost always paid by insurers. These findings call into question policy arguments in support of the implementation of damages caps to lower liability insurance premiums and improve patient care.

=== Methodology ===
Zeiler has advocated for the increased use of empiricism in health law, specifically through the utilization of data and use of the scientific method. Zeiler and Michelle Mello have examined the use of empirical field studies to study causation and policy interventions. While the strict adoption of the scientific method's "gold standard" of the randomized controlled trial can be difficult in the field of health law, Zeiler and Mello argue that fixed-effects models and difference-in-difference models can be used as tools of causal identification in health law studies.
