= Predictably Irrational =

2008 book by Dan Ariely

Predictably Irrational: The Hidden Forces That Shape Our Decisions
- Author: Dan Ariely
- Language: English
- Genre: Behavioral economics
- Publisher: HarperCollins
- Publication date: February 2008
- Publication place: United States
- Media type: Print (Hardcover)
- Pages: 304
- ISBN: 978-0-06-135323-9
- OCLC: 182521026
- Dewey Decimal: 153.8/3 22
- LC Class: BF448 .A75 2008

Predictably Irrational: The Hidden Forces That Shape Our Decisions is a 2008 book by Dan Ariely, in which he challenges readers' assumptions about making decisions based on rational thought. Ariely explains, "My goal, by the end of this book, is to help you fundamentally rethink what makes you and the people around you tick. I hope to lead you there by presenting a wide range of scientific experiments, findings, and anecdotes that are in many cases quite amusing. Once you see how systematic certain mistakes are—how we repeat them again and again—I think you will begin to learn how to avoid some of them".

The book has been republished in a revised & expanded edition, and has been adapted as the 2023 television series The Irrational.

== Chapter summary ==
Ariely discusses many modes of thinking and situations that may skew the traditional rational choice theory. There are 15 chapters in total, and the following outline the main points.

=== The Truth About Relativity ===
In chapter 1, Ariely describes the ways in which people frequently regard their environment in terms of their relation to others; it is the way that the human brain is wired. People not only compare things, but also compare things that are easily comparable. For example, if given the following options for a honeymoon—Paris (with free breakfast), Rome (with free breakfast), and Rome (no breakfast included), most people would probably choose Rome with the free breakfast. The rationale is that it is easier to compare the two options for Rome than it is to compare Paris and Rome. Ariely also explains the role of the decoy effect (or asymmetric dominance effect) in the decision process. The decoy effect is the phenomenon whereby consumers will tend to have a specific change in preference between two options when also presented with a third option that is asymmetrically dominated. This effect is the "secret agent" in many decisions. In the example with the honeymoon options, Rome without free breakfast is the decoy. (It makes Rome with breakfast look superior to Rome without breakfast. Comparing Rome and Paris is difficult, so the easy comparison of Rome makes it more likely to choose Rome over Paris.) It makes Paris look inferior when compared to Rome with the free breakfast. Relativity helps people make decisions but it can also make them miserable. People compare their lives to those of others, leading to jealousy and inferiority. Ariely finishes the chapter by saying "the more we have, the more we want" and his suggested cure is to break the cycle of relativity. To break the cycle, people can control what goes on around them. The focus on smaller "circles" can boost relative happiness, as can changing this focus from narrow to broad. When considering upgrading a phone, the consumer could think about what else they could buy with the money they would spend on the upgrade.

The chapter also explores the independence of irrelevant alternatives and the idea of menu dependence.

=== The Fallacy of Supply and Demand ===
In chapter 2, consumers purchase items based on value, quality, or availability—often on all three. The methods of appointing a value to an object with no previous value, like the Tahitian black pearl, is susceptible to irrational pricing. A value can be as easily (arbitrarily) assigned as by having a fancy ad with "equally" precious items and a high price tag in a window of a store on Fifth Avenue. When consumers buy a product at a certain price, they become "anchored" to that price, i.e. they associate the initial price with the same product over a period of time. An anchor price of a certain object, say a plasma television, will affect the way they perceive the value of all plasma televisions henceforth. Other prices will seem low or high in relation to the original anchor. In other words, decisions about future LCD television purchases become coherent after an initial price has been established in the consumer's mind. A person's self value for services rendered can also be affected by anchor prices; one can irrationally price his/her abilities or services based on an anchor price proposed. Using the concepts of anchor price and arbitrary coherence, Ariely challenges the theory of supply and demand. He states that demand, the determinant of market prices, can be easily manipulated. Furthermore, supply and demand are dependent on each other (manufacturer's suggested retail prices affect consumers' willingness to pay). Finally, the author claims that the relationships between supply and demand are based on memory rather than on preferences.

=== The Cost of Zero Cost ===
In chapter 3, Ariely explains how humans react to the words "free" and "zero". Humans make decisions without rationalizing the outcomes of their choices. To illustrate this point, Ariely conducted multiple experiments. The outcome was consistent: when faced with multiple choices, the free option was commonly chosen. With the opportunity to receive something for free, the actual value of the product or service is no longer considered. Ariely claims, "Most transactions have an upside and a downside, but when something is FREE! we forget the downside. FREE! gives us such an emotional charge that we perceive what is being offered as immensely more valuable than it really is."

Ariely's concept of "FREE!" applies not only to monetary and quantitative costs, but also to time. We forgo some of our time when we wait in line for free popcorn or to enter a museum on a free-entrance day. We could have been doing something else at that time. Ultimately, he demonstrates how such a simple concept can be used to drive business and social policy. For example, to reduce health cost, companies could offer free regular checks. Employees would be more willing to get them at zero cost rather than paying some amount of money. Ariely recommends the consideration of the net benefits of the choices we make regarding both preference and money. Perhaps we would get the better deal and even save money if we did not react to free the way we do.

=== Being Paid vs. A Friendly Favor ===
In chapters 4 and 5, Ariely speaks in great detail of the differences between social norms—which include friendly requests with instant payback not being required—and market norms—which account for wages, prices, rents, cost benefits, and repayment being essential.

He also explains how combining the two can create troubling situations. The author comments that people are happy to do things occasionally when they are not paid for them. In fact there are some situations in which work output is negatively affected by payment of small amounts of money. Tests showed that work done as a "favor" sometimes produced much better results than work paid for.

For example, some lawyers were asked by AARP to provide needy retirees with services at a cost of about $30. The lawyers did not accept the offer. However, when asked to offer services at no cost, they agreed. Experiments also showed that offering a small gift would not offend anybody (the gift falls into social norms), but mentioning the monetary value of the gift invokes market norms.

Ariely talks about how social norms are making their way into the market norms. To illustrate, State Farm's slogan, "Like a good neighbor, State Farm is there," provides an example where companies are trying to connect with people on a social level in order to gain trust and allow the customer to overlook minor infractions. The author concludes that "money, as it turns out, is the most expensive way to motivate people. Social norms are not only cheaper, but often more effective as well."

=== Emotion in Decision Making ===
In chapter 6, Ariely collaborated with close friend George Loewenstein, a professor of economics and psychology at Carnegie Mellon University, to test the influence of arousal on decision making in high-emotion situations. Ariely and Loewenstein chose to test the effects of sexual arousal on decision-making in college-aged men at University of California, Berkeley. By using computers to stimulate sexual arousal, they determined that in a stimulated state, the young men were more likely to undergo an action that they would not normally consider. Using the data, Ariely argues that other high-emotion situations such as anger, frustration, and hunger have the potential to trigger similar effects on decision-making. In such situations our behavior is fully controlled by emotions. We are not the people we thought we were. No matter how much experience we have we make irrational decisions every time we are under the influence of arousal. Furthermore, he presents ideas to improve our decision-making abilities in other emotion-provoking situations such as safe sex, safe driving, and making other life decisions. For example, Ariely proposes an OnStar system that could potentially lower the number of car accidents in teenagers by performing tasks such as changing the car's temperature or dialing the teenager's mother when the car exceeds a set speed.

=== The Problem of Procrastination and Self-control ===
In chapter 7, over the last decade Americans have shown surprisingly little self-control. Ariely blames this lack of self-control on people's two states in which they make their judgments—cool state and hot state. In our cool state we make rational long-term decisions, whereas in our hot state we give in to immediate gratification and put off our decisions made in the cool state.

Ariely describes putting off these goals for immediate gratification as procrastination. With proper motivators such as deadlines and penalties, people are more willing to meet deadlines or long-term goals. The author states that based on his experience with his students, deadlines set by authority figures such as teachers and supervisors make us start working on a specific task earlier. If we set the deadlines ourselves, we might not perform well. Moreover, we will not start making any progress towards the completion of the task until the deadline approaches.

Ariely also applies his theories to other aspects in life such as health care and savings. Having to pay a deposit at the doctor's office would make people more likely not to procrastinate and show up for their appointments. He goes on to say that if more consequences were put into effect, people would be more likely to meet their goals, appointments, deadlines, etc. made in a cool state. Ariely also elaborates on his idea of self-control credit cards. When applying for such a card, users can decide how much they can spend in each category and what would happen when they exceed their limit.

=== The High Price of Ownership ===
In chapter 8, Ariely discusses how we overvalue what we have, and why we make irrational decisions about ownership. The idea of ownership makes us perceive the value of an object to be much higher if we own the object. This illustrates the phenomenon of the endowment effect—placing a higher value on property once possession has been assigned. The author begins the chapter by using an example of how a lottery for highly sought-after Duke University basketball tickets inflates students' sense of value for the tickets. Students who actually received the tickets valued them ten times more than the students who did not receive them.

Ariely gives three reasons why we do not always think rationally when it comes to our possessions:

1. Ownership is such a big part of our society that we tend to focus on what we may lose rather than on what we may gain.
2. The connection we feel to the things we own makes it difficult for us to dispose of them.
3. We assume that people will see the transaction through our eyes.

Ariely also lists the "peculiarities" of ownership as he calls them. One of them is that the harder we work on something, the more we start feeling about them as our own. Take assembling a piece of furniture as an example. Another peculiarity is that sometimes, the sense of ownership comes before the actual ownership, e.g. online auctions. To avoid the endowment effect, Ariely suggests that we create a barrier between ourselves and the material things we are tempted by daily.

=== The Effect of Expectations ===
In chapter 9, Ariely and other colleagues conducted a series of experiments to determine whether previous knowledge can change an actual sensory experience. One of the experiments was conducted in the Muddy Charles, one of the MIT's pubs. Students visiting the pub tasted two types of beer—Budweiser and the MIT Brew (which contains balsamic vinegar).

In the "blind test" the majority preferred the altered brew, but when they were told in advance that it was vinegar-laced, they chose the original Budweiser. Another group of students was made aware of the vinegar content immediately after tasting both kinds of drinks. However, they still reported that they preferred it, proving that knowledge after the experience does not affect our sensory perceptions.

Ariely also states that expectations shape stereotypes. Stereotypes provide us with knowledge before the actual experience and thus influence our perceptions. The author describes an experiment in which an objective math exam was administered to two groups of Asian-American women. Before taking the test, the women from the first group were asked questions regarding gender-related issues, whereas the second group had to answer questions about race-related issues. The second group did better than the first one and met the expectation that Asians are good at math.

Ariely concludes, "Expectations can influence nearly every aspect in one's life." He presents an argument that expectations can override our senses, partially blinding us from the truth.

=== The Power of Placebo ===
In chapter 10, Ariely started out with a medical procedure called internal mammary artery ligation for chest pain. The interesting twist is when a cardiologist decided to test the efficacy of this procedure by performing a placebo procedure. The result showed that the placebo is equally effective, thereby disputing the effectiveness of the original surgery. This example is one of many that illustrate the power of placebo in medical science.

While the effect of placebo has been knowingly and unknowingly practiced for millennia, the interesting observation Ariely and his collaborators made was that prices of the prescribed medicine can be used as a placebo as well. This chapter ended with a complex and moral question as to whether or not the placebo effect in medicine should be studied more closely or even eliminated systematically.

== Television adaptation ==
In November 2021, it was reported that NBC had put a pilot commitment to a television series adaptation of the book titled The Irrational with Arika Lisanne Mittman as executive producer. In February 2022, it was announced that NBC had given the production a pilot order. In December 2022, it was announced that NBC had given the production a series order with Jesse L. Martin set to star. In May 2023, it was announced that the series would premiere in the 2023–24 television season. The series premiered on September 25, 2023.

== Reception ==
In a New York Times review, David Berreby said "Predictably Irrational is a far more revolutionary book than its unthreatening manner lets on. It's a concise summary of why today's social science increasingly treats the markets-know-best model as a fairy tale."

== See also ==
- Cognitive bias
- Dysrationalia
- Rational choice theory

== General and cited references ==
- Ariely, Dan (2008). Predictably Irrational, Harper Collins. ISBN 978-0-06-135323-9
