= Willingness to accept =

Minimum price a seller is willing to accept for one unit of their product

In economics, willingness to accept (WTA) is the minimum monetary amount that а person is willing to accept to sell a good or service, or to bear a negative externality, such as pollution. This is in contrast to willingness to pay (WTP), which is the maximum amount of money a consumer (a buyer) is willing to sacrifice to purchase a good/service or avoid something undesirable. Both of these are kinds of reservation prices. The price of any transaction will thus be any point between a buyer's willingness to pay and a seller's willingness to accept; the net difference is the economic surplus.

Several methods exist to measure consumer willingness to accept payment. These methods can be differentiated by whether they measure consumers' hypothetical or actual willingness to accept, and whether they measure it directly or indirectly.

Choice modelling techniques may be used to estimate the value of WTA through a choice experiment. Contingent Value techniques are also common and directly ask respondents what they would be willing to accept for different hypothetical scenarios.

== Formal definition ==
Let u(w, x) be an individual's utility function, where w is the person's wealth and x is a dummy variable that takes the value 1 in the presence of an undesired feature and takes the value 0 in the absence of that feature. The utility function is assumed to be increasing in wealth and decreasing in x. Also, define w_{0} as the person's initial wealth. Then the willingness to accept is defined by

$u(w_0 + WTA , 1) = u(w_0 , 0).$

That is, the willingness to accept payment in order to put up with the adverse change equates the pre-change utility (on the right side) with the post-change utility, including compensation.

In contrast, the willingness to pay is defined by

$$u(w_0 - WTP, 0)= u(w_0, 1).$$

That is, the willingness to pay to avoid the adverse change equates the post-change utility, diminished by the presence of the adverse change (on the right side), with utility without the adverse change but with payment having been made to avoid it.

The concept extends readily to a context of uncertain outcomes, in which case the utility function above is replaced by the expected value of a von Neumann-Morgenstern utility function (see expected utility hypothesis).

== Standard theory versus experimental results ==
The standard assumptions of economic theory imply that with the absence of income effects, there is no difference between WTA and WTP. Thus indifference curves are drawn without reference to current endowments. This leads to the wide acceptance of the Coase theorem assertion that, subject to income effects, the allocation of resources will be independent of the assignment of property rights when costless trades are possible. This is to say, the allocation of property rights does not influence the way externalities are internalized by the market. However, many experiments, such as that by Daniel Kahneman, Jack L. Knetsch and Richard Thaler showed that measures of WTA greatly exceed measures of WTPF. Theories have been formed based on these experiments which aim to explain the disparity between WTA and WTP.

=== Income effect ===
The income effect has been used by multiple studies to explain the disparity between WTA and WTP. They argue that due to income constraints, there is a maximum price people are able to pay, whereas there is no bounds on what people are willing to accept. For example, the willingness to pay to stop the ending of one's own life can only be as high as one's wealth, while the willingness to accept compensation to accept the loss of one's life would be an extremely high number (or maybe infinite, meaning that there would be no finite acceptable payment amount).

=== Endowment effect ===
The endowment effect argues that ownership results in loss aversion as people attach value to owned objects, resulting in a higher WTA of a good or service than WTP. The greater the degree of loss aversion, the greater the gap between WTA and WTP.

A well-known example of this effect was documented by Ziv Carmon and Dan Ariely, who found that willingness to accept for tickets to a major basketball game was more than 10 times larger than the willingness to pay. Showing that the endowment effect makes people value a good or service more if they possess it.

The endowment effect theory's conclusions about the relationship between WTA-WTP has recently come under criticism. Plott and Zeiler argued that "...observed gaps [between WTA and WTP] are symptomatic of subjects' misconceptions about the nature of the experimental task" and that "the differences reported in the literature reflect differences in experimental controls for misconceptions as opposed to differences in the nature of the commodity." As a consequence of this work, alternative theories regarding the endowment effect and WTA-WTP correlations have become more widespread, as it may be possible that some economic scholarship about the WTA-WTP gaps are a result of experimental design issues.

Evidence of the endowment effect is widespread in contingent valuation. Contingent valuation is a common method in identifying how consumers value various things like healthcare, safety and the environment. The WTA and WTP are very common methods for contingent valuation, where subjects are asked exactly how much money they would be willing to accept in order to receive one less unit of the goods or conversely how much they would pay to receive additional unit of goods. Mathematically that is, how much would it take for them to consume x rather than x+1 or how much would they pay to consume x+1 rather than x. Through this questioning, we are able to identify the value on the x+1st unit of the good.

Given prior acceptance and acknowledgment of the endowment effect, it comes at little surprise that the WTA and WTP return differing results. The WTA method makes the subjects sure that if they are losing any level of consumption, that they may want considerable sums of money in order to offset the loss of goods. The WTP on the other hand leads subjects to believe that losing money may not be worth the additional unit of the good. The disparity between these two valuation has been shown to be quite large on occasion. What we experience form these results is a systematic violation of procedural invariance, leading us to have answers that are largely dependent on the procedure used, this acts as a specific example of the larger framing effect.

This has raised question about the fundamental valuation given by people. This stems from the endowment effects natural tendency to imply physical ownership of a good. The WTA (and WTP) measures then push for people to think about the potential ownership of goods and services and is seemingly enough to trigger an endowment effect and subsequently alter the reference point.

=== Hypothetical bias ===
An article exploring the effects of WTA and WTP in the public health services sector concluded that hypothetical bias is higher with less information about a good or service and higher information costs. WTP as a result is lower with high hypothetical bias, resulting in a disparity between WTA and WTP.

== Practical applications ==
WTP and WTA are important factors for public policy. Many economic decisions are based upon the implicit assignment of property rights. When looking at a lake which is being polluted by a nearby factory, the WTA and WTP for treatment of an effluent treatment plant may have different consequences based upon how property rights are politically assigned. If lakeside residents have no property right to an effluent-free lake, then their willingness to pay to treat the lake's water supply would be considered. Conversely, if the lakeside residents are found to have a property right to a clean lake, then their willingness to accept compensation for a polluted lake would be considered.

== See also ==
- Becker-DeGroot-Marschak method
- Gains from trade
- Opportunity cost
- Property rights (economics)
- Willingness to pay
- Willingness to recommend
