= James Bettman =

American academic

James Ross Bettman
- Born: September 15, 1943 (age 83); Laurinburg, North Carolina
- Title: Burlington Industries Professor

Academic background
- Education: Yale University
- Thesis: Behavioral Simulation Models in Marketing Systems (1969)
- Doctoral advisor: Gerrit Wolf

Academic work
- Discipline: Marketing; Consumer behavior Psychology
- Institutions: Duke University; University of California, Los Angeles
- Doctoral students: Dan Ariely; Kevin Keller; Itamar Simonson; Baba Shiv

James R. Bettman is an American academic who is the Burlington Industries Professor of Business Administration at Fuqua School of Business, Duke University. He is a Fellow of the American Marketing Association, American Psychological Association, the American Psychological Society, and the Association for Consumer Research.

== Books ==
- An Information Processing Theory of Consumer Choice, Addison-Wesley, 1979, p. 402, ISBN 978-0201008340
