= The Upside of Irrationality =

2010 book by Dan Ariely

- Author: Dan Ariely
- Language: English
- Genre: Nonfiction
- Publisher: Harper
- Publication date: 2010
- Publication place: United States
- Pages: 334 (hardcover)
- ISBN: 978-0061995033

The Upside of Irrationality: The Unexpected Benefits of Defying Logic is a book published in 2010 by Israeli-American behavioral economist Dan Ariely. It is Ariely's second book, after 2008's Predictably Irrational: The Hidden Forces That Shape Our Decisions, and it expands on the ideas presented in that work.

In The Upside of Irrationality, Ariely, the James B. Duke Professor of Psychology and Behavioral Economics at Duke University, describes different experiments and how individuals participating in them react to the variable of irrationality, which he argues can be used for positive change.
