= Mere ownership effect =

Tendency to place higher value on an object one owns

The mere ownership effect is the observation that people who own a good tend to evaluate it more positively than people who do not.

It is typically demonstrated in a paradigm in which some participants in an experiment are randomly assigned to own a good ("owners") by receiving it for free. Other participants are randomly assigned to simply evaluate the same good without receiving it. Participants who own the good typically rate it as more attractive or as liking it more than do participants who do not own it. It is not necessary to actually own a good to exhibit the mere ownership effect. Simply touching or imagining that one owns a good is enough to instantiate the mere ownership effect.

The mere ownership effect is often used as a case in which people show the endowment effect that cannot be parsimoniously explained by loss aversion.

== Origins ==
Two routes have been proposed to explain the mere ownership effect. Both rely on the association of a good with the self.

Attachment theory
One set of theorists believe that these self-associations take the form of an emotional attachment to the good. Once an attachment has formed, the potential loss of the good is perceived as a threat to the self.
Self-referential memory theory
Another set of theorists believe that ownership increases the perceived value of a good through a self-referential memory effect (SRE) – the better encoding and recollection of stimuli associated with the self-concept. Attributes of a good may be more accessible to its owners than are other attributes of the transaction. Because most goods have more positive than negative features, this accessibility bias should result in owners more positively evaluating their goods than do non-owners.

== See also ==
- Mere-exposure effect
