= (Dis)Honesty: The Truth About Lies =

2015 documentary film

- Film poster
- Directed by: Yael Melamede
- Produced by: Dan Ariely; Deborah Camiel
- Starring: Dan Ariely
- Edited by: Erin Barnett; Chad Beck
- Release date: April 9, 2015 (Full Frame Documentary Film Festival)
- Running time: 90 minutes
- Language: English

(Dis)Honesty: The Truth About Lies is a 2015 feature-length documentary film directed by Yael Melamede. It explores the reasons why people lie and the methods they use. It features direct testimony, footage and the experimental research carried out by Dan Ariely.

== Release ==
(Dis)Honesty: The Truth About Lies premiered at the 2015 Full Frame Documentary Film Festival.

== Critical response ==
Variety stated about the film: "this entertaining mix of anecdotal evidence, academic research and current affairs is a diverting survey that should hold appeal for niche buyers in various formats". The Hollywood Reporter described (Dis)Honesty: The Truth About Lies as a "deep-think doc animated by the researcher at its center". The New York Times criticized the lack of exploration of the loss of trust in the wider society.

The film has an 89% rating, with an average score of 7.02/10 based on 18 reviews, on Rotten Tomatoes. It has a rating of 60/100 on Metacritic, stating "Mixed or average reviews based on 6 Critics".

== See also ==
- The Honest Truth about Dishonesty
