= Itamar Simonson =

Israeli-born American professor of marketing

- איתמר סימונסון
- Born: 25 December 1951 (age 74); Israel

Academic background
- Doctoral advisor: James Bettman

Academic work
- Discipline: Consumer research, decision making, marketing
- Institutions: Stanford Graduate School of Business

Itamar Simonson (Hebrew: איתמר סימונסון) is a professor of marketing, holding the Sebastian S. Kresge Chair of Marketing in the Graduate School of Business, Stanford University. He is known for his work on the factors that determine the choices that buyers make. His academic career started at the University of California at Berkeley, where he taught for six years, before he moved to Stanford. Many of his former PhD students (such as Ravi Dhar, Ziv Carmon, Stephen Nowlis, Aimee Drolet, and Ran Kivetz to name a few) hold senior positions at some of the best universities in the world.

== Education ==
He received his B.A. in Economics and Political Science from the Hebrew University in 1976, his MBA from the UCLA School of Management in 1978 and his PhD in marketing from Duke University in 1987.

== Work ==
=== Consumer choice ===
Simonson has studied both preferences that are created "on the fly" when people make choices and predetermined preference elements that reflect people's habits, predispositions, and genes. He began studying consumer choice in 1987. Simonson's doctoral dissertation introduced the notion that consumers select the options that are supported by the best reasons or justifications, rather than the options that maximize utility. He demonstrated the "compromise effect", whereby consumers often select the middle or, alternatively, an "extreme" option in a set regardless of its real values. Consumers often rely on a comparison with the options they encounter, and "compromise" because it is the easiest to justify and least likely to be criticized. He also showed how consumers use irrelevant product features to determine an option's attractiveness. For example, offering consumers a product "bonus" (e.g., getting the option to pay for a collector's plate when buying a product) that many regard as unneeded leads consumers to reject that brand and prefer a competing option.

Simonson also demonstrated that the mere fact that consumers buy multiple products at the same time (e.g., several cartons of yogurt for several days) causes them to choose more variety than they would have selected had they bought just one product each time.

=== Anticipating regret ===
Anticipating the possibility of regret tends to lead consumers to buy a product that is on "sale" now instead of waiting for a better "sale" later, and to choose a well-known, expensive brand over a lesser-known, less expensive brand. When making risky choices, anticipating regret leads to the opposite effect than anticipating responsibility or blame.

=== Idiosyncratic fit heuristic ===
Kivetz and Simonson showed that people tend to put too much weight when making choices on product aspects that fit them better than others, referred to as the "Idiosyncratic Fit Heuristic." They demonstrated the implications of this tendency (or heuristic) with respect to participation in loyalty programs and the evaluation of other offers and opportunities.

=== Highlighting versus balancing and ratings versus choice ===
Dhar and Simonson examined conditions that lead consumers to either "go all the way" (e.g., buy a tasty but unhealthy entree and also tasty but unhealthy dessert), referred to as highlighting, versus trying to balance things out (e.g., on a particular trip, flying first class but taking an inexpensive shuttle bus to the airport). Nowlis and Simonson examined the different consumer preferences that emerge from rating of individual options as opposed to choosing between options.

=== Expectation and satisfaction ===
As Ofir and Simonson showed, telling customers before a service encounter or a shopping experience that they would later be asked to evaluate that experience causes them to be less satisfied, and customers who state their expectations from a service before the experience are also less satisfied.

=== Inherent preferences ===
Simonson has argued that it is meaningful to assume that consumers have dormant preferences for product configurations even before the products embedding those preferences exist. For example, consumers may have a dormant preference for a licorice candy even before ever trying such a candy and they might have a preference for a videogame system using a motion-sensitive remote even before such a game system was invented. The ultimate inherent preferences are those that are largely heritable. In particular, initial evidence obtained by Simonson and Sela indicates that many consumer preferences (e.g., for compromise options, pleasurable versus useful products, chocolate, jazz, science fiction movies, and hybrid cars) are significantly heritable.

== Awards ==
Simonson has received many awards for his research, including Honorary Doctorate: University of Paris II – Sorbonne Universities, awards for the best article published in the Journal of Marketing Research, Journal of Consumer Research, Journal of Public Policy & Marketing, as well as awards from the Association of Consumer Research, American Marketing Association, and the Society for Consumer Psychology. Notably, he was named a fellow of the Association for Consumer Research in 2013.

== Selected works ==
- Simonson, Itamar; Rosen, Emanuel (2014). Absolute Value: What Really Influences Customers in the Age of (Nearly) Perfect Information. HarperBusiness. ISBN 9780062215680.
- Simonson, Itamar (September 1989). "Choice Based on Reasons: The Case of Attraction and Compromise Effects". Journal of Consumer Research. 16 (2): 158–174. doi:10.1086/209205. S2CID 144558711.
- Simonson, Itamar (May 1990). "The Effect of Purchase Quantity and Timing on Variety-Seeking Behavior". Journal of Marketing Research. 27 (2). American Marketing Association: 150–162. doi:10.2307/3172842. JSTOR 3172842.
- Simonson, Itamar (June 1992). "The Influence of Anticipating Regret and Responsibility on Purchase Decisions". The Journal of Consumer Research. 19 (1). The University of Chicago Press: 105–118. doi:10.1086/209290. JSTOR 2489192. S2CID 143398052.
- Simonson, Itamar; Amos Tversky (August 1992). "Choice in Context: Tradeoff Contrast and Extremeness Aversion". Journal of Marketing Research. 29 (3). American Marketing Association: 281–295. doi:10.2307/3172740. JSTOR 3172740.
- Tversky, Amos; Itamar Simonson (October 1993). "Context-Dependent Preferences". Management Science. 39 (10): 1179–1189. doi:10.1287/mnsc.39.10.1179. JSTOR 2632953.
- Simonson, Itamar; Carmon, Ziv; O'Curry, Suzanne (1994). "Experimental Evidence on the Negative Effect of Product Features and Sales Promotions on Brand Choice". Marketing Science. 13 (1): 23–40. doi:10.1287/mksc.13.1.23.
- Nowlis, Stephen M.; Itamar Simonson (February 1996). "The Effect of New Product Features on Brand Choice". Journal of Marketing Research. 33 (1): 36–46. doi:10.2307/3152011. JSTOR 3152011.
- Stephen Nowlis and Itamar Simonson (1997), "Attribute–Task compatibility as a Determinant of Consumer Preference Reversals," Journal of Marketing Research, 34 (May), 205–218.
- Chezy Ofir and Itamar Simonson (2001), "In Search of Negative Customer Feedback: The Effect of Expecting to Evaluate on Satisfaction Evaluations,” Journal of Marketing Research, 38 (May), 170–82.
- Ran Kivetz and Itamar Simonson (2003) "The Idiosyncratic Fit Heuristic: The Role of Effort Advantage in Consumer Response to Loyalty Programs,” Journal of Marketing Research, 40 (November), 454–67.
- Simonson, Itamar (2008). "Regarding Inherent Preferences". Journal of Consumer Psychology. 18 (3): 191–196. doi:10.1016/j.jcps.2008.04.007.
- Simonson, Itamar (2008). "Will I Like a 'Medium' Pillow? Another Look at Constructed and Inherent Preferences". Journal of Consumer Psychology. 18 (3): 155–169. doi:10.1016/j.jcps.2008.04.002. S2CID 142933662.
