= Willingness to recommend =

Customer satisfaction metric

Willingness to recommend is a metric related to customer satisfaction. When a customer is satisfied with a product, he or she might recommend it to friends, relatives and colleagues. This willingness to recommend can be a powerful marketing advantage. In a survey of nearly 200 senior marketing managers, 57 percent responded that they found the "willingness to recommend" metric very useful.

== Purpose ==
Although sales or market share can indicate how well a firm is performing currently, satisfaction is perhaps the best indicator of how likely it is that the firm’s customers will make further purchases in the future. Willingness to recommend is a key metric relating to customer satisfaction.

== Construction ==
Willingness to recommend is calculated as the percentage of surveyed customers who indicate that they would recommend a brand to friends, or as the average strength of their willingness if the survey allows for a range of degrees of willingness.

The usual measures of willingness to recommend involve a survey with a set of statements using a Likert Technique or scale. The customer is asked to indicate how willing they are to make a recommendation (of a brand, service, etc.) to others. Their willingness is generally measured on a five-point scale.

Both the wording of the question and the wording of the scale item responses may vary widely among surveyors. Willingness data can also be collected on a 7-point or 10-point scale.

== Methodologies ==
Perhaps the best known measure of willingness to recommend is the Net Promoter Score (NPS) first introduced by Fred Reichheld.

No willingness to recommend methodology has been independently audited by the Marketing Accountability Standards Board (MASB) according to MMAP (Marketing Metric Audit Protocol).

== See also ==
- Willingness to accept
- Willingness to pay
