= Qapital =

Personal finance software

- Developer(s): Qapital, LLC
- Initial release: December 2013 (Sweden); March 2015 (US)
- Operating system: iOS and Android
- Type: Personal finance
- Website: www.qapital.com

Qapital is a personal finance mobile application (app) for the iOS and Android operating systems, developed by Qapital, LLC. The app is designed to motivate users to save money through a gamification of their spending behavior. It moves money from a user's checking account to a separate Qapital account, when certain rules are triggered. Its database is used by psychology professor Dan Ariely to study consumer behavior. Qapital was released in Sweden in 2013, then in the US in early 2015. The application was later withdrawn from the Swedish market in April 2015, in order to focus on the US market.

== History ==
The idea for Qapital was conceived by ex-bankers in Sweden. The software was designed by twin brothers Daniel and Andreas Källbom of Studio Källbom and released in Sweden in December 2013. The original software was a personal finance dashboard, similar to Mint.com, to show its users how they spent their money.

Qapital introduced the app into the US market with a different design in 2014 and started focusing exclusively on the US market. The app was re-designed to focus on building savings rather than managing personal finances. The Swedish version shut down in April 2015. The app was initially restricted to the iOS platform, but an Android version was released at the end of 2015.

Shortly after its US launch, Qapital invited psychology professor Dan Ariely to join its team as its "chief behavioral economist". He uses the app's database to conduct research into behavioral economics and Qapital in turn uses Ariely's research in design and programming decisions. In 2017, Qapital added checking and debit card services to the app.

== Concept and features ==
Screenshot of the Qapital app

Qapital is a free personal finance app for iOS and Android devices, intended to encourage its users to save money. Qapital directs each of its users to set savings goals, then automatically transfers money from their checking account to an account for savings, when a rule established in the app is met. It uses the "if this then that" (IFTTT) rule-based web-service. For example, one rule could be that if a user purchases a cup of coffee, then the app will round up the charge to the nearest dollar and deposit the difference into savings. Users connect their bank accounts to Qapital, so it knows when purchases are made. When a rule is met, money for savings are transferred to a Qapital account operated in partnership with Lincoln Savings Bank.

As of 2015, Qapital can connect to more than 180 other apps, such as Facebook, Twitter, Dropbox and Instagram. For example, connecting to Jawbone allows the user to set a rule that if they take a certain number of steps during the day, a set amount of money is transferred to savings. The app also allows users to monitor activity among their other financial accounts, such as deposits and withdrawals.

== Reception ==
In an October 2015 review, PC Magazine gave Qapital four out of five marks and an editor rating of "excellent." The review praised the app for having a "lovely design" and criticized it for being a, "bit simplistic in some of its rules."

Bankrate, in a May 2015 review, gave the app a score of 3/5 for "ease of use," 5/5 for "features," 4/5 for "effectiveness," 4/5 for "value," for a total score of 16/20. The reviewer criticized Qapital's savings account for providing a low-interest rate, but concluded that its numerous features make the app "intriguing" and "it would be difficult to find a standard bank app more fun to use than Qapital."
