= The Irrational =

2023 American crime drama TV series

- Genre: Police procedural; Crime drama
- Created by: Arika Mittman
- Based on: Predictably Irrational by Dan Ariely
- Starring: Jesse L. Martin; Maahra Hill; Travina Springer; Molly Kunz; Arash DeMaxi
- Composer: Danny Lux
- Country of origin: United States
- Original language: English
- No. of seasons: 2
- No. of episodes: 29

Production
- Executive producers: Arika Mittman; Mark Goffman; Samuel Baum
- Producer: Jesse L. Martin
- Running time: 42 minutes
- Production companies: Simon-Binx Productions; Samuel Baum Productions; Off the Cliff Entertainment; Universal Television

Original release
- Network: NBC
- Release: September 25, 2023 – March 25, 2025

The Irrational is an American crime drama television series created by Arika Mittman. It is loosely based on the life of Dan Ariely, a behavioral economist and professor at Duke University, and his 2008 non-fiction book Predictably Irrational: The Hidden Forces That Shape Our Decisions. The show features Jesse L. Martin in the role of Alec Mercer, a behavioral scientist who, like Ariely, lends his expertise to governments, law enforcement, and corporations to solve complex issues. Co-stars include Molly Kunz as Pheobe, Alec's grad student, and Maahra Hill as Special Agent Marisa Clark.

Season one of The Irrational premiered on September 25, 2023, on NBC and season two began airing a year later, on October 8, 2024. With the series' premiere attracting over 3.8 million viewers, it received mixed reviews from critics and a 5.1/10 rating on Rotten Tomatoes.

In May 2025, the series was canceled after two seasons. The final episode aired with a cliffhanger on March 25, 2025.

== Premise ==
Professor Alec Mercer is a professor of behavioral psychology, whose interests, human irrationality in particular, reflect Ariely's own work in behavioral economics. Like his prototype, Mercer demonstrates how unconscious biases and emotional impulses influence decision-making, often in ways that defy logical reasoning. Throughout the show, Mercer applies his insights into human nature to help the police and the FBI solve high-stakes criminal cases, including murders, plane crashes, and kidnappings. It echoes Ariely's real-life role as a consultant to governments and corporations, where he leverages his expertise in behavioral science to address complex societal challenges such as policy-making, health decisions, and fraud detection. Additionally, Mercer's personal backstory, including the life-changing injury that left him physically scarred, mirrors Ariely's experience of suffering injuries after an explosion—an accident that aroused his interest in understanding the emotional and psychological dimensions of pain and human behavior.

== Cast and characters ==
=== Main ===
- Jesse L. Martin as Professor Alec Mercer, an expert in behavioral science
- Maahra Hill as Special Agent Marisa Clark, an FBI agent and Alec's ex-wife
- Arash DeMaxi as Rizwan Asadi, Alec's newest grad student
- Molly Kunz as Phoebe Duncan, Alec's grad student assistant
- Travina Springer as Kylie Mercer, Alec's younger sister and new FBI cyber analyst

=== Recurring ===
- Brian King as Special Agent Jace Richards (season 1), an FBI agent and Marisa's new boyfriend
- Karen David as Rose Dinshaw, a crisis management professional, and Alec's new girlfriend
- Ben Cotton as Wes Banning (season 1), a criminal convicted of the bombing that injured Alec
- Max Lloyd-Jones as Simon Wylton (season 2), a new grad student research assistant who replaces Phoebe, and the son of the Dean of Wylton Institute
- Geoff Stults as Shel Benson (season 2)

== Episodes ==
=== Series overview ===
Season	Episodes	Originally released		Rank	Average viewership (in millions)	Ref
Season	Episodes	First released	Last released	Rank	Average viewership (in millions)	Ref
1	11	September 25, 2023	February 19, 2024	30	5.94	
2	18	October 8, 2024	March 25, 2025	TBA	TBA	TBA

=== Season 1 (2023–24) ===
No. overall	No. in season	Title	Directed by	Written by	Original release date	U.S. viewers (millions)	Rating/share (18-49)
1	1	"Pilot"	David Frankel	Arika Lisanne Mittman	September 25, 2023	3.81	0.34/3
2	2	"Dead Woman Walking"	Jesse Warn	Arika Lisanne Mittman	October 2, 2023	3.98	0.29/3
3	3	"The Barnum Effect"	John Terlesky	Mark Goffman	October 9, 2023	3.94	0.31/3
4	4	"Zero Sum"	Janice Cooke	Robert Hewitt Wolfe	October 16, 2023	3.50	0.24/2
5	5	"Lucky Charms"	Amanda Tapping	Lydia Teffera	October 23, 2023	3.73	0.29/3
6	6	"Point and Shoot"	Ernest Dickerson	Story by : Kirk Moore & Jordan Rosenberg; Teleplay by : Kirk Moore	October 30, 2023	3.54	0.27/3
7	7	"The Real Deal"	Jesse Warn	Mira Z. Barnum	November 6, 2023	3.74	0.28/3
8	8	"Scorched Earth"	Maja Vrvilo	Jordan Rosenberg	January 29, 2024	3.18	0.28/3
9	9	"Cheating Life"	Carl Seaton	Jordan Rosenberg & Mira Z. Barnum	February 5, 2024	3.30	0.26/3
10	10	"Bombshell"	Jesse Warn	Mark Goffman & Robert Hewitt Wolfe	February 12, 2024	2.60	0.19/2
11	11	"Reciprocity"	Ernest Dickerson	Arika Lisanne Mittman	February 19, 2024	2.42	0.18/2

=== Season 2 (2024–25) ===
No. overall	No. in season	Title	Directed by	Written by	Original release date	U.S. viewers (millions)	Rating/share (18-49)
12	1	"Collateral Damage"	John Terlesky	Arika Lisanne Mittman	October 8, 2024	3.09	0.31/4
13	2	"A Kick in the Teeth"	Ernest Dickerson	Lydia Teffera	October 15, 2024	2.63	0.26/3
14	3	"Bad Blood"	Jeff W. Byrd	Mark Goffman & Robert Hewitt Wolfe & Jojo S. Wright	October 22, 2024	2.41	0.19/3
15	4	"Formal Ties"	Jesse Warn	Katie Wech	October 29, 2024	2.29	0.19/2
16	5	"Anatomy of a Fall"	Darnell Martin	Mira Z. Barnum	November 12, 2024	2.19	0.17/2
17	6	"The Wrong Side of Maybe"	Holly Dale	Jordan Rosenberg	November 26, 2024	2.41	0.19/3
18	7	"Stan by Me"	Sarah Wayne Callies	Kirk Moore	December 3, 2024	2.39	0.17/3
19	8	"Lost Souls"	John F. Showalter	Robert Hewitt Wolfe	January 7, 2025	2.16	0.18/3
20	9	"Another Man's Treasure"	Doug Aarniokoski	Tommar Wilson	January 14, 2025	2.09	0.16/2
21	10	"Now You Don't"	Jesse Warn	Aadrita Mukerji	January 21, 2025	1.90	0.10/1
22	11	"Ghost Ship"	Jesse Warn	Kirk Moore & Lydia Teffera	January 28, 2025	1.64	0.12/2
23	12	"Straight from the Heart"	Rebecca Moline	Jojo S. Wright	February 4, 2025	1.67	0.15/2
24	13	"Murder She Rode"	Jon Huertas	Lydia Teffera & Katie Wech	February 11, 2025	1.81	0.14/2
25	14	"The Milgram Experiment"	Jesse Warn	Kirk Moore & Mira Z. Barnum	February 18, 2025	1.78	0.15/2
26	15	"Conversation Games"	Cherie Nowlan	Robert Hewitt Wolfe & Jordan Rosenberg	February 25, 2025	1.65	0.16/2
27	16	"The Overview Effect"	Anna Mastro	Mark Goffman	March 11, 2025	1.60	0.12/2
28	17	"Suddenly Alec"	Ernest Dickerson	Aadrita Mukerji & Tommar Wilson	March 18, 2025	1.67	0.13/2
29	18	"The Exchange"	Dawn Wilkinson	Arika Lisanne Mittman	March 25, 2025	2.26	0.17/3

== Production ==
=== Development ===
In November 2021, NBC announced it had given a put pilot commitment to The Irrational, and Arika Mittman stepped in as the show's writer and executive producer. So did Mark Goffman, Samuel Baum, David Frankel, and Dan Ariely. In February 2022, The Irrational received a pilot order. In April 2022, it was announced Jesse L. Martin had been cast as the show's lead character, Alec Mercer, and would also serve as a producer for the pilot. It was also announced that the series would be written by Arika Mittman, with Dan Ariely serving as consultant. In September 2022, NBC commissioned a mini-room to produce a couple of backup scripts to go with the well-received pilot. In October 2022, NBC extended its options on the cast, which were due to expire in October, to that December. In December 2022, NBC picked up The Irrational pilot and gave it a series order. It was revealed at this time that David Frankel was the director and would also be serving as an executive producer along with Mittman, Mark Goffman and Samuel Baum. On November 17, 2023, NBC ordered an extra episode for the series, bringing the first-season order to a total of 11 episodes. On November 29, 2023, NBC renewed the series for a second season. On May 9, 2025, NBC canceled the series after two seasons.

=== Casting ===
In May 2022, it was announced that Maahra Hill would join the cast in a lead role opposite Martin. In June 2022, Travina Springer, Molly Kunz, and Arash DeMaxi were added to the cast. In June 2023, Brian King joined the cast in a recurring role.

Season 2 featured the same actors, along with Ariely himself, who joined the cast as a psychiatric patient.

=== Filming ===
Filming of the pilot took place from late May to early June 2022 in Vancouver, Canada, standing in for Washington, D.C. and the adjoining Virginia area. After seven episodes were filmed, production stopped due to the 2023 WGA and SAG-AFTRA strikes. Filming for the second season began on March 11, 2024 and concluded on November 2, 2024.

== Release ==
The Irrational premiered on September 25, 2023, on NBC. It is available to stream on Peacock. The pilot episode of The Irrational then premiered on September 27, 2023, on USA Network. The second season premiered on October 8, 2024 on NBC.

== Reception ==
The review aggregator website Rotten Tomatoes reported an approval rating of 47% with an average rating of 5.1/10, based on 17 critic reviews. The website's critical consensus reads, "The Irrational could've used a lot more originality to live up to its promise, although Martin's shrewd presence makes even the utterly conventional pretty watchable." Metacritic, which uses a weighted average, assigned a score of 55 out of 100 based on 14 critics, indicating "mixed or average reviews".

=== Ratings ===
Viewership and ratings per season of The Irrational
Season	Timeslot (ET)	Episodes	First aired		Last aired		TV season	Viewership rank	Avg. viewers (millions)	18–49 rank	Avg. 18–49 rating
Season	Timeslot (ET)	Episodes	Date	Viewers (millions)	Date	Viewers (millions)	TV season	Viewership rank	Avg. viewers (millions)	18–49 rank	Avg. 18–49 rating
1	Monday 10:00 p.m.	11	September 25, 2023	3.81	February 19, 2024	2.42	2023–24	30	5.94	55	0.48
2	Tuesday 10:00 p.m.	18	October 8, 2024	3.09	March 25, 2025	2.26	2024–25	TBD	TBD	TBD	TBD
