= Self-referential encoding =

Method of organizing information in one's memory

Self-referential encoding is a method of organizing information in one's memory in which one interprets incoming information in relation to oneself, using one's self-concept as a background. Examples include being able to attribute personality traits to oneself or to identify recollected episodes as being personal memories of the past. The implications of self-referential processing are evident in many psychological phenomena. For example, the "cocktail party effect" notes that people attend to the sound of their names even during other conversation or more prominent, distracting noise. Also, people tend to evaluate things related to themselves more positively (This is thought to be an aspect of implicit self-esteem). For example, people tend to prefer their own initials over other letters. The self-reference effect (SRE) has received the most attention through investigations into memory. The concepts of self-referential encoding and the SRE rely on the notion that relating information to the self during the process of encoding it in memory facilitates recall, hence the effect of self-reference on memory. In essence, researchers have investigated the potential mnemonic properties of self-reference.

Research includes investigations into self-schema, self-concept and self-awareness as providing the foundation for self-reference's role in memory. Multiple explanations for the self-reference effect in memory exist, leading to a debate about the underlying processes involved in the self-reference effect. In addition, through the exploration of the self-reference effect, other psychological concepts have been discovered or supported, including simulation theory and the group reference effect. After researchers developed a concrete understanding of the self-reference effect, many expanded their investigations to consider the self-reference effect in particular groups like those with autism spectrum disorders or those experiencing depression.

== Self-concept and self-schema ==
Self-knowledge can be categorized by structures in memory or schemata. A self-schema is a set of facts or beliefs that one has about themselves. For any given trait, an individual may or may not be "schematic"; that is, the individual may or may not think about themselves as to where they stand on that trait. For example, people who think of themselves as very overweight or who identify themselves to a greater extent based on their body weight would be considered "schematic" on the attribute of body weight. Thus, many everyday events, such as going out for a meal or discussing a friend's eating habits, could induce thoughts about the self. When people relate information to something that has to do with the self, it facilitates memory. Self-descriptive adjectives that fit into one's self-schema are easier to remember than adjectives not viewed as related to the self. Thus, the self-schema is an aspect of oneself that is used as an encoding structure that brings upon memory of information consistent with one's self-schema. Memories that are elaborate and well encoded are usually the result of self-referent correlations during the process of remembering. During the process of encoding, trait representations are encoded in long term memory either directly or indirectly. When they are directly encoded, it is in terms of relating to the self, and when it is indirectly encoded it is done through spouts of episodic information instead of information about the self.

Self-schema is often used as somewhat of a database for encoding personal data. The self-schema is also used by paying selective attention to outside information and internalizing that information more deeply in one's memory depending on how much that information relates to their schema. When self-schema is engaged, traits that go along with one's view of themselves are better remembered and recalled. These traits are also often recalled much better when processed with respect to the self. Similarly, items that are encoded with the self are based on one's self-schema. Processing the information should balance out when recalled for individuals who have a self-schema that goes along with the information.

Self-schemas do not necessarily only involve individual traits. People self-categorize at different levels that range from more personal to more social. Self-schemas have three main categories which play a role: the personal self, the relational self, and the collective self. The personal self deals with individual level characteristics, the relational self deals with intimate relationship partners, and the collective self deals with group identities, relating to self-important social groups to which one belongs (e.g., one's family or university). Information that is related to any type of self-schema, including group-related knowledge structures facilitates memory.

In order for the self to be an effective encoding mechanism, it must be a uniform, consistent, well-developed schema. It has been shown that identity exploration leads to the development of self-knowledge which facilitates self-judgments. Identity exploration led to shorter decision times, higher confidence ratings and more intrusions in memory tasks. Previous researchers hypothesized that words compatible with a person's self-schema are easily accessible in memory and are more likely than incompatible words to intrude on a schema-irrelevant memory task. In one experiment, when participants were asked to decide if certain adjectives were "like me" or "not like me," they made the decisions faster when the words were compatible with their self-schema.

However, despite the existence of the self-reference effect when considering schemata consistent adjectives, the connection between the self and memory can lead to a larger number of mistakes in recognition, commonly referred to as false alarms. Rogers et al. (1979) found that people are more likely to falsely recognize adjectives they had previously designated to be self-descriptive. Expanding on this, Strube et al. (1986) found that false alarms occurred more for self-schema consistent content, presumably because the presence of such words in the schema makes them more accessible in memory.

In addition to investigating the self-reference effect in regards to schemata consistent information, Strube et al. discussed how counter schemata information relates to this framework. They noted that the pattern of making correct decisions more rapidly did not hold when considering words that countered a person's self-schema, presumably because they were difficult to integrate into memory due to lack of a preexisting structure. That is, they lacked the organizational structure of encoding because they did not fall into the "like me" category, and elaboration would not work because prior connections to the adjective did not exist.

=== Self-awareness and personality ===
Two of the most common functions of the self receiving significant attention in research are the self-acting to organize the individual's understanding of the social environment, and the self functioning to regulate behavior through self-evaluation. The concept of self-awareness is considered to be the foundational principle for both functions of the self. Some research presents self-awareness in terms of self-focused attention whereas Hull and Levy suggest that self-awareness refers to the encoding of information based on its relevance to the self. Based on the latter interpretation of self-awareness, individuals must identify the aspects of situations that are relevant to themselves and their behavior will be shaped accordingly. Hull and Levy suggest that self-awareness corresponds to the encoding of information cued by self-symbolic stimuli, and examine the idea of self-awareness as a method of encoding. They structured an investigation that examined self-referent encoding in individuals with different levels of self-awareness, predicting that individuals with higher levels of self-consciousness would encode self-relevant information more deeply than other information, and that they would encode it more deeply than individuals with low levels of self-consciousness. The results of their investigation supported their hypothesis that self-focused attention is not enough to explain the role of self-awareness on attribution. Their results suggest that self-awareness leads to increased sensitivity to the situationally defined meanings of behavior, and therefore organizes the individual's understanding of the social environment. The research presented by Hull and Levy led to future research on the encoding of information associated with self-awareness.

In later research, Hull and colleagues examined the associations between self-referential encoding, self-consciousness and the extent to which a stimulus is consistent with self-knowledge. They first assumed that the encoding of a stimulus is facilitated if an individual's working memory already contains information consistent with the stimulus, and suggested that self-consciousness as an encoding mechanism relies on an individual's self-knowledge. It is known that situational and dispositional factors may activate certain pools of knowledge, moving them into working memory, and guiding the processing of certain stimulus information.

In order to better understand the idea of activating information in memory, Hull et al. presented an example of how information is activated. They referred to the sentence "The robber took the money from the bank". In English, the word bank has two applicable meanings in the context of this sentence (monetary institution and river shore). However, the monetary institution meaning of the word is more highly activated in this context due to the addition of the words robber and money to the sentence, because they are associatively relevant and therefore pull the monetary institution definition for bank into working memory. Once information is added to working memory, meanings and associations are more easily drawn. Therefore, the meaning of this example sentence is almost universally understood.

In reference to self-consciousness and self-reference, the connection between self-consciousness and self-referent encoding relies on such information activation. Research suggests that self-consciousness activates knowledge relating to the self, thereby guiding the processing of self-relevant information. Three experiments conducted by Hull and colleagues provided evidence that a manipulation of accessible self-knowledge impacts self-referent encoding based on the self-relevance of such information, individual differences in the accessibility of self-knowledge (self-consciousness) impacts perception, and a mediation relationship exists between self-consciousness and individual differences in self-referential encoding.

Similar to how self-awareness impacts the availability of self-knowledge and the encoding of self-relevant information, through the development of the self-schema, people develop and maintain certain personality characteristics leading to a variety of behavior patterns. Research has been done on the differences between Type A and Type B behavior patterns, focusing on how people in each group respond to environmental information and their interpretation of the performance of others and themselves. It has been found that Type A behavior is characterized by competitive achievement striving, time urgency and hostility, whereas Type B is usually defined as an absence of Type A characteristics. When investigating causal attributions for hypothetical positive and negative outcomes, Strube et al. found that Type A individuals were more self-serving, in that they took greater responsibility for positive than negative effects. Strube and colleagues argued that this could be a result of the fact that schema-consistent information is more easily remembered and the ease with which past successes and failures are recalled, determined by self-schema, would impact attributions. It is reasonable to believe that Type A's might recall successes more easily and hence be more self-serving.

== Theoretical background ==
Influential psychologists Craik and Lockhart laid the groundwork for research focused on self-referential encoding and memory. In 1972 they proposed their Depth of Processing framework which suggests that memory retention depends on how the stimulus material was encoded in memory. Their original research considered structural, phonemic, and semantic encoding tasks, and showed that semantic encoding is the best method to aid in recall. They asked participants to rate 40 descriptive adjectives on one of four tasks; Structural (Big font or small font?), Phonemic (Rhymes with xxx?), Semantic (Means same as xxx?), or Self-reference (Describes you?). This was then followed by an "incidental recall task". This is where participants are asked, without prior warning, to recall as many of the words they had seen as possible within a given time limit. Craik and Tulving's original experiment showed that structural and phonemic tasks lead only to "shallow" encoding, while the semantic tasks lead to "deep" encoding and resulted in better recall.

However, in 1977, it was shown that self-relevant or self-descriptive encoding leads to even better recall than semantic tasks. Experts suggest that the call on associative memory required by semantic tasks is what provides the advantage over structural or phonemic tasks, but is not enough to surpass the benefit provided by self-referential encoding. The fact that self-reference was shown to be a stronger memory encoding method than semantic tasks is what led to more significant interest in the field One early and significant experiment aimed to place self-reference on Craik and Lockhart's depth of processing hierarchy, and suggested that self-reference was a more beneficial encoding method than semantic tasks. In this experiment, participants filled out self-ratings on 84 adjectives. Months later, these participants were revisited and were randomly shown 42 of those words. They then had to select the group of 42 "revisited" words out of the total original list. The researchers argued that if the "self" was involved in memory retrieval, participants would incorrectly recognize words that were more self-descriptive In another experiment, subjects answered yes or no to cue questions about 40 adjective in 4 tasks (structural, phonemic, semantic and self-referential) and later had to recall the adjectives. This experiment validated the strength of self-reference as an encoding method, and indicated it developed a stronger memory trace than the semantic task.

Researchers are implementing a new strategy by developing different encoding tasks that enhance memory very similarly to self-referential encoding. Symons (1990) had findings that went against the norm when he was unable to find evidence of self-schematicity in the self-reference effect. Another finding was that when referencing gender and religion, there was a low memory recall when compared with referencing the self. A meta-analysis by Symons and Johnson (1997) showed self-reference resulting in better memory in comparison to tasks relying on semantic encoding or other-referent encoding. According to Symons and Johnson, self-referencing questions elicit elaboration and organization in memory, both of which creating a deeper encoding and thus facilitate memory.

Theorists that favor the view that the self has a special role believe that the self leads to more in depth processing, leading to easier recall during self-reference tasks. Theorists also promote the self-schema as being one of the sole inhibitors that allow for recall from deep memory. Thorndyke and Hayes-Roth had the goal of focusing on the process made by the active memory schemata. Sex-typed individuals recall trait adjectives that go along with their sex role more quickly than trait adjectives that are not. During the process of free recall, these individuals also showed more patterns for gender clustering than other sexually typed individuals.

== Types of self-referential encoding tasks ==
As research on self-referential encoding became more prolific, some psychologists took an opportunity to delineate specific self-referential encoding tasks. It is noted that descriptive tasks are those that require participants to determine if a stimulus word can be classified as "self-descriptive." Autobiographical tasks are those that require participants to use the stimulus word as a cue to recall an autobiographical memory. Results from experiments that differentiated between these types of self-referential encoding found that they both produced better recall than semantic tasks, and neither was more advantageous than the other. However, research does suggest that the two types of self-referential encoding do rely on different processes to facilitate memory. In most experiments discussed, these types of self- referential encoding were not differentiated.

In a typical self-reference task, adjectives are presented and classified as either self-descriptive or not. For example, in a study by Dobson and Shaw, adjectives about the self that were preselected were given to the participants and they decide whether or not the adjectives are self-descriptive. The basis for making certain judgments, decisions, inferences and decisions is a self-referent encoding task. If two items are classified as self-descriptive there is no reason one trait would not be equally as easy to retrieve as the other on a self-reference task.

== Explanations for the self-reference effect ==
While a significant amount of research supports the existence of the self-reference effect, the processes behind it are not well understood. However, multiple hypotheses have been introduced, and two main arguments have been developed: the elaborative processing hypothesis and the organizational processing hypothesis. Encodings in reference to the self are so elaborate because of the information one has about the self. Information encoded with the self is better remembered than information encoded with reference to something else.

=== Elaboration ===
Elaboration refers to the encoding of a single word by forming connections between it and other material already stored in memory. By creating these connections between the stimulus word and other material already in memory, multiple routes for retrieval of the stimulus word are formed. Based on the depth of processing framework, memory retention increases as elaboration during encoding increases. The Elaborative Processing Hypothesis would suggest that any encoding task that leads to the development of the most trace elaboration or associations is the best for memory retention. Additional research on the depth of processing hierarchy suggests that self-reference is the superior method of information encoding. The elaborative hypothesis would suggest this is because self-reference creates the most elaborate trace, due to the many links that can be made between the stimulus and information about the self already in memory.

=== Organization ===
The organizational processing hypothesis was proposed by Klein and Kihlstrom. This hypothesis suggests that encoding is best prompted by considering stimulus words in relation to one another. This thought process and relational thinking creates word to word associations. These inter-item associations are paths in memory that can be used during retrieval. Also, the category labels that define the relations between stimulus items can be used as item cues. Evidence of the organizational component of encoding is demonstrated through the clustering of words during recall. Word clustering during recall indicates that relational information was used to store the words in memory. Rogers, Kuiper and Kirker showed that self-referential judgments were more likely to encourage organization than semantic ones. Therefore, they suggested the self-reference effect was likely due to the organizational processing endured by self-referential encoding.

Structural, phonemic and semantic tasks within the depth of processing paradigm require words to be considered individually, and lend themselves to an elaborative approach. As such, it can be argued that self-referential encoding is superior because it leads to an indirect division of words into categories: words that describe me versus words that do not. Due to this connection between self-reference and organizational processing, further research has been done on this area. Klein and Kihlstrom's research suggests first that, like previous research, self-reference led to better recall than semantic and structural encoding. Second, they found that self-referentially encoded words were more clustered in recall than words from other tasks, suggesting higher levels of organizational processing. From this they concluded that the organization, not encoding task, is what makes self-referential encoding superior

=== Dual process ===
Psychologists Einstein and Hunt showed that both elaborative processing and organizational processing facilitate recall. However, their research argues that the effectiveness of either approach depends on how related the stimulus words are to one another. A list of highly related stimulus words would be better encoded using the elaborative method. The relations between the words would be evident to subjects; therefore, they would not gain any additional pathways for retrieval by encoding the words based on their categorical membership. Instead, the other information gained through elaborative processing would be more beneficial. On the other hand, a list of stimulus words with little relation would be better stored to memory through the organizational method. Since the words have no obvious connection to one another, subjects would likely encode them individually, using an elaborative approach. Since relational information wouldn't be readily detected, focusing on it would add to memory by creating new traces for retrieval. Superior recall was better explained by a combination of elaboration and organization.

Ultimately, the exact processes behind self-referential encoding that makes it superior to other encoding tasks are still under debate. Research suggests that if elaborative processing is behind self-referential encoding, a self-referential task should have the same effect as an elaborative task, whereas if organizational processing underlies the self-reference effect self-referential encoding tasks should function like organizational tasks. To test this, Klein and Loftus ran a 3x2 study testing organizational, elaborative and self-referential encoding with lists of 30 related or unrelated words. When participants were asked to memorize the unrelated list, recall and clustering were higher for the organizational task, which produced almost equal results to the self-referential task, suggesting that has an organizational basis. For the list of related words, the elaborative task led to better recall and had matched results to the self-reference task, suggesting an elaborative basis. This research, then, suggests that the self-reference effect cannot be explained by a single type of processing. Instead, self-referential encoding must lead to information in memory that incorporates item specific and relational information.

Overall, the SRE relies on the unique mnemonic aspects of the self. Ultimately, if the research is suggesting that the self has superior elaborative or organizational properties, information related to the self should be more easily remembered and recalled. The research presented suggests that self-referential encoding is superior because it promotes organization and elaboration simultaneously, and provides self-relevant categories that promote recall.

== Social brain science ==
The field of social brain science is aimed at examining the neural foundations of social behavior. Neuroimaging and neuropsychology have led to the examination of neuroanatomy and its connection to psychological topics. Through this research, neuropsychologists have found a connection between social cognitive functioning and the medial prefrontal cortex (mPFC). In addition, the mPFC has been connected to reflection and introspection about personal mental states. Supporting these findings, it has been shown that damage to the mPFC is connected to impairments with self-reflection, introspection and daydreaming, as well as social competence, but not other areas of functioning. As such, the mPFC has been connected to self-referential processing.

The research discussed by those focusing on the neuroanatomy of self-referential processing included similar tasks to the memory and depth of processing research discussed previously. When participants were asked to judge adjectives based in whether or not they were self-descriptive, it was noted that the more self-relevant the trait, the stronger the activation of the mPFC. In addition, it was shown that the mPFC was activated during the appraisal of one's own personality traits, as well as during trait retrieval. One study showed that the more activity in the mPFC during self-referential judgments, the more likely the word was to be remembered on a subsequent surprise memory test. These results suggest that the mPFC is involved in both self-referential processing and in creating self-relevant memories.

Medial prefrontal cortex (mPFC) activation occurs during processing of self-relevant information. When self-referent judgment is more relatable and less negative, the mFPC is activated. Finding support clear cut circuits that have high levels of activation when cognitive and emotional aspects of self-reflection are present. The caudate nucleus has not been associated with self-reference before, however, Fossati and colleagues found activity while participants were retrieving self-relevant trait adjectives. The ventral anterior cingulate cortex (vACC) is also a part of the brain that becomes activated when there are signs of self-referencing and processing. The vACC is activated when self-descriptive information is negative. There is also pCC (posterior cingulate cortex) activity seen in neuroimaging studies during self-referential processing.

=== Depth of processing or cognitive structure ===
Given all of the neurological support for the effect of self-reference on encoding and memory, there is still a debate in the psychological community about whether or not the self-reference effect signifies a special functional role played by the self in cognition. Generally, this question is met by people that have two opposing views on the processes behind self-reference. On one side of the debate, people believe that the self has special mnemonic abilities because it is a unique cognitive structure. On the other side, people support the arguments described above that suggest there is no special structure, but instead, the self-reference effect is simply a part of the standard depth of processing hierarchy. Since the overall hypothesis is the same for both sides of the debate, that self-relevant material leads to enhanced memory, it is difficult to test them using strictly behavioral measures. Therefore, PET and fMRI scans have been used to see the neural marker of self-referential mental activity.

Previous studies have shown that areas of the left prefrontal cortex are activated during semantic encoding. Therefore, if the self-reference effect works the same way, as part of the depth of processing hierarchy, the same brain region should be activated when judging traits related to the self. However, if the self has unique mnemonic properties, then self-referential tasks should activate brain regions distinct from those activated during semantic tasks. The field is still at is infancy, but future work on this hypothesis might help to settle the debate about the underlying processes of self-referential encoding.

=== Simulation theory ===
While not able to completely settle the debate over the foundation of self-referential processing, studies on the neurological aspect of personality trait judgments did lead to a related, significant result. It has been shown that judging personality traits about oneself and a close friend activated overlapping brain regions, and the activated regions have all been implicated in self-reference. Noting the similarity between making self-judgments and judgments about close others led to the introduction of the simulation theory of empathy. Simulation theory rests on the idea that one can make inferences about others by using the knowledge they have about themselves. In essence, the theory suggests that people use self-reflection to understand or predict the mental state of others. The more similar a person perceives another to be, the more active the mPFC has shown to be, suggesting more deep or intricate self-reference. However, this effect can cause people to make inaccurate judgments about others or to believe that their own opinions are representative of others in general. This misrepresentation is referred to as the false-consensus effect.

== Expansion of the SRE: group reference ==
In addition to simulation theory, other expansions of the self-reference effect have been examined. Through studying the self, researchers have found that the self consists of many independent cognitive representations. For example, the personal self composed of individual characteristics is separate from the relational self which is based on relationships with significant others. These two forms of self are again separate from the collective self which corresponds to a particular group identity. Noting the existence of the collective self and the different group identities that combine to form such a self-representation led researchers to question if information stored in reference to a social group identity has the same effects in memory as information stored in reference to the individual self. In essence, researchers questioned if the self-reference effect can be extended to include situations where the self is more socially defined, producing a group-reference effect.

Previous research supports the idea that the group-reference effect should exist from a theoretical standpoint. First, the self-expansion model argues that individuals incorporate characteristics of their significant others (or other in-group members into the development of their self-concept. From this model, it is reasonable to conclude that characteristics that are common to both oneself and their significant others (or in-group members) would be more accessible. Second, the previous research discussed suggests that the self-reference effect is due to some combination of organizational, elaborative, mental cueing or evaluative properties of self-referential encoding tasks. Given that we have significant stores of knowledge about our social identities, and such collective identities provide an organizational framework, it is reasonable to assume that a group-reference task would operate similar to that of a self-reference task.

In order to test these claims, Johnson and colleagues aimed to test whether the self-reference effect generalized to group level identities. Their first study was structured to simply assess if group-reference influenced subsequent memory. In their experiment, they used membership at a particular university as the group of reference. They included group-reference, self-reference and semantic tasks. The experiment replicated the self-reference effect, consistent with previous research. In addition, evidence for a group-reference effect was found. Group-referenced encoding produced better recall than the semantic tasks, and the level of recall from the group-referenced task was not significantly different from the self-referenced task.

Despite finding evidence of a group-reference effect, Johnson and colleagues pointed out that people identify with numerous groups, each with unique characteristics. Therefore, in order to reach conclusive evidence of a group-reference effect, alternative group targets need to be considered. In a second experiment by Johnson et al., the group of reference was modified to be the family of the individual. This group has fewer exemplars than the pool of university students, and affective considerations of the family as a group should be strong. No specific instructions or definitions were provided for family, allowing individuals to consider either the group as a whole (prototype) or specific exemplars (group). When the experiment was repeated using family as the group of reference, group-reference produced recall as much as self-reference. The mean number of recall for the group-reference was higher than self-reference. Participants indicated that they considered both the prototype and individual exemplars when responding to the questions, suggesting that the magnitude of the group-reference effect might not be dependent on the number of exemplars in the target group.

Both experiments presented by Johnson et al. found evidence for the group-reference effect. However, these conclusions are limited to the target groups of university students and family. Other research included gender (males and females) and religion (Jewish) as the reference groups and the group-reference effect on memory was not as evident. The group-reference recall for these two groups was not significantly more advantageous than the semantic task. Questioning what characteristics of reference groups that lead to the group-reference effect, a meta-analysis of all four group-reference conditions was performed. This analysis found that self-reference emerged as the most powerful encoding device; however, evidence was found to support the existence of a group-reference effect. The size of the reference groups and number of specific, individual exemplars was hypothesized to influence the existence of the group-reference effect. In addition, accessibility and level of knowledge about group members may also impact such an effect. So, while university students is a much larger group than family, individual exemplars may be more readily accessible than those in a religious group. Similarly, different cognitive representations were hypothesized to influence the group-reference effect. When a larger group is considered, people may be more likely to consider a prototype which may lead to fewer elaborations and cues later on. Smaller groups may lead to relying on the prototype and specific exemplars. Finally, desirability judgments that influence later processing may be influenced by self-reference and certain group-reference tasks. Individuals may be more sensitive to evaluative implications for the personal self and some group identities, but not others.

Groups are also a major part of the self; therefore we attribute the role that different groups play in our self-concept also play a role in the self-reference effect. We process information about group members similarly to how we process for ourselves. Recall of remarks referencing our home and our self and group to familiarity of those aspects of our self. Reference to the self and social group and the identity that comes along with being a part of a social group are equally affective for memory. This is especially true when the groups are small, rather than large.

Ultimately, the group-reference effect provides evidence to explain the tendency to notice or pay attention to and remember statements made in regard to our home when traveling in a foreign place. Considering the proposal that groups form part of the self, this phenomenon can be considered an extension of the self-reference effect. Similar to the memorable nature of references to a person's individual self, references to social identities are seemed to be privileged in memory as well.

== Applications ==
Once the foundation of research on self-referential encoding was established, psychologists began to explore how the concept applied to different groups of people, and connected to different phenomena.

=== Autism spectrum disorder ===
Individuals diagnosed with autism spectrum disorders (ASDs) can display a wide range of symptoms. Some of the most common characteristics of individuals with ASDs include impairments with social functioning, language and communication difficulties, repetitive behaviors and restricted interests. In addition, it is often noted that these individuals are more "self-focused." That is, they have difficulty seeing things from another's perspective. Despite being self-focused, though, research has shown that individuals with ASD's often have difficulty identifying or describing their emotions or the emotions of others. When asked to describe their daily experiences, responses from individuals on the autism spectrum tended to focus more on physical descriptions rather than mental and emotional states. In regards to their social interactions and behavior differences, it is thought that these individuals lack top down control, and therefore, their bottom up decisions remain unchecked. This simply suggests that these individuals cannot use their prior knowledge and memory to make sense of new input, but instead react to each new input individually, compelling them to make a whole picture

Noting the difficulty individuals with ASDs experience with self-awareness, it was thought that they might have difficulty with self-related memory processes. Psychologists questioned if these individuals would show the typical self-reference effect in memory. In one Depth of Processing Study, participants were asked questions about the descriptiveness of certain stimulus words. However, unlike previous DOP studies that focused on phonemic, structural, semantic and self-referential tasks, the tasks were altered for this experiment. To test the referential abilities of individuals with ASD's, the encoding tasks were divided into: "the self," asking to what extent a stimulus word described oneself, "similar close other," asking to what extent a stimulus word was descriptive of one's best friend, "dissimilar non-close other," asking to what extent a stimulus word was descriptive of Harry Potter, and a control group that was asked to determine the number of syllables in each word. Following these encoding tasks, participants were given thirty minutes before a surprise memory task. It was found that individuals with ASD's had no impairment in memory for words encoded in the syllable or dissimilar non-close other condition. However, they had decreased memory for words related to the self.

Therefore, while research suggests that self-referentially encoded information is encoded more deeply than other information, the research on individuals with ASD's showed no advantage for memory recognition with self-reference tasks over semantic encoding tasks. This suggests that individuals with ASD's don't preferentially encode self-relevant information. Psychologists have investigated the biological basis for the decreased self-reference effect among individuals with Autism Spectrum Disorders and have suggested that it may be due to less specialized neural activity in the mPFC for those individuals. However, while individuals with ASD's showed smaller self-reference effects than the control group, some evidence of a self-reference effect was evident in some cases. This indicates that self-referent impairments are a matter of degree, not total absence.

Lombardo and his colleagues measured empathy among individuals with ASD's, and showed that these individuals scored lower than the control group on all empathy measures. This may be a result of the difficulty for these individuals to understand or take the perspective of others, in conjunction with their difficulty identifying emotions. This has implications for simulation theory, because these individuals are unable to use their self-knowledge to make conclusions about similar others.

Ultimately, the research suggests that people with ASD's might benefit from being more self-focused. The better their ability to reflect on themselves, the better the can mentalize with others.

=== Depression ===
There are three possible relations between cognitive processes and anxiety and depression. The first is whether cognitive processes are actually caused by the onset of clinically diagnosed symptoms of major depression or just generalized sadness or anxiousness. The second is whether emotional disorders such as depression and anxiety are able to be considered as caused by cognitions. And the third is whether different specific cognitive processes are able to be considered associates of different disorders. Kovacs and Beck (1977) posited a schematic model of depression where an already depressed self was primed by outside prompts that negatively impacted cognitive illusions of the world in the eye of oneself. These prompts only led participants to a more depressive series of emotions and behavior. The results from the study done by Derry and Kuiper supported Beck's theory that a negative self-schema is present in people, especially those with depressive disorder. Depressed individuals attribute depressive adjectives to themselves more than nondepressive adjectives. Those suffering from a more mild case of depression have trouble deciphering between the traits of themselves and others which results in a loss of their self-esteem and their negative self-evaluation. A depressive schema is what causes the negativity reported by those suffering from depression. Kuiper and Derry found that self-referent recall enhancement was limited only to nondepressed content.

Generally, self-focus is association with negative emotions. In particular private self-focus is more strongly associated with depression than public self-focus. Results from brain-imaging studies shows that during self-referential processing, those with major depressive disorder show greater activation in the medial prefrontal cortex, suggesting that depressed individuals may be exhibiting greater cognitive control than non-depressed individuals when processing self-relevant information.
