= The Honest Truth About Dishonesty =

2012 book by Dan Ariely

The Honest Truth About Dishonesty: How We Lie to Everyone—Especially Ourselves
- First edition (US)
- Author: Dan Ariely
- Subject: Psychology
- Genre: Non-fiction
- Publisher: HarperCollins
- Publication date: 2012
- Media type: Print (hardcover and paperback)
- Pages: 304
- ISBN: 0007477333

The Honest Truth About Dishonesty: How We Lie to Everyone—Especially Ourselves is a 2012 book by the Duke University cognitive science professor Dan Ariely. It investigates why and when cheating occurs, debates its usefulness and questions how it can be discouraged.

The book was translated into Hebrew in 2013.

== Contents ==
In The Honest Truth About Dishonesty, Ariely uses several experiments to investigate the nature of dishonesty. In one, he discovers that, a refrigerator in a college dormitory that contains cans of Coca-Cola and dollar bills, the soda cans would disappear faster because taking money would make the students feel more like thieves than taking soda cans. In another experiment, an actor playing a University of Pittsburgh student took a test at rival Carnegie Mellon University. He deliberately and clearly cheated on the test and acted confused about some of the rules of the test. Ariely examined how the rest of the group responded and concluded that cheating is contagious. In addition to reporting on experiments he conducted, Ariely mentions his own experiences with dishonesty, such as once riding a train on a forged Eurail pass or being told, as a burn victim, that he would be all right despite the medical evidence to the contrary. He offers that honor codes and close supervision may decrease dishonesty somewhat but do not account for the psychological rationalization.

== Reception ==
The Honest Truth About Dishonesty was positively received. Writing in The New York Times, Janet Maslin praised Ariely's "simple, cheery style" of writing. She also liked how the book "has a disarming personal touch". President of Wesleyan University Michael S. Roth noted that "Ariely raises the bar for everyone. In the increasingly crowded field of popular cognitive science and behavioral economics, he writes with an unusual combination of verve and sagacity. He asks us to remember our fallibility and irrationality, so that we might protect ourselves against our tendency to fool ourselves."
