= David Berreby =

American writer

- Born: 1958 (age 67–68); France
- Education: Yale University
- Occupations: Science Writer, Researcher, Editor
- Writing career
- Language: English
- Genre: Non-fiction
- Subject: The Science of Identity
- Notable works: Us and Them: The Science of Identity (2008)
- Notable awards: Erving Goffman Award for Outstanding Scholarship

David Berreby is the author of the book Us and Them: The Science of Identity (2008, University of Chicago Press). His work has appeared in The New Yorker, Nature, The New York Times Magazine, Slate, Smithsonian, The Journal of Strategy and Business, The Huffington Post and many other publications.

== Biography ==
Berreby is an independent science writer and researcher. He was born in France in 1958 to an American mother and Jewish father. His native language is English, although he briefly spoke French. He has spent most of his life in New York City, but attended a "chaotic and untraditional high school run by hippies and idealists" in California. He received his B.A. in English in 1981 from Yale University.

David has worked as an Editor for the City University of New York, Associate Editor for The Sciences at the New York Academy of Sciences, as well as a Freelancer for Discover Magazine. In 1995 David became Science Writing Fellow at the Marine Biological Laboratory in Woods Hole, Massachusetts. His writing has appeared in the New Yorker, the New York Times Magazine, Smithsonian, The New Republic, Slate, Lingua Franca and many other publications.

== Awards ==
Berreby's book, Us and Them: The Science of Identity (under its previous name Us and Them: Understanding Your Tribal Mind) won the 2006 Erving Goffman Award for Outstanding Scholarship from the Media Ecology Association.

== Works by Berreby ==
- Us and Them: The Science of Identity (University Of Chicago Press)
- The Things That Divide Us (National Geographic Vol. 233 No. 4)
- The Case for Fitting In
- Bird's Life
- The Punishment Fits the Crime
- Ravens, Robots, and the Nature of Humanness
- Genius in the Making:If a scientific theory about Jews being smart is so politically incorrect, why aren't more people complaining?
- Human Kinds in the Brain: An MRI scan of racial perception
- Can a language be "endangered"?
- Human Kinds in the Making: Race and the Mind
- Dear Colleague...
- Murray Gell-Mann's Quest
- Human Kinds in the Making: The Attention Deficit Tribe
- The Obesity Era
