= Ziv Carmon =

Israeli-born business academic

- זיו כרמון
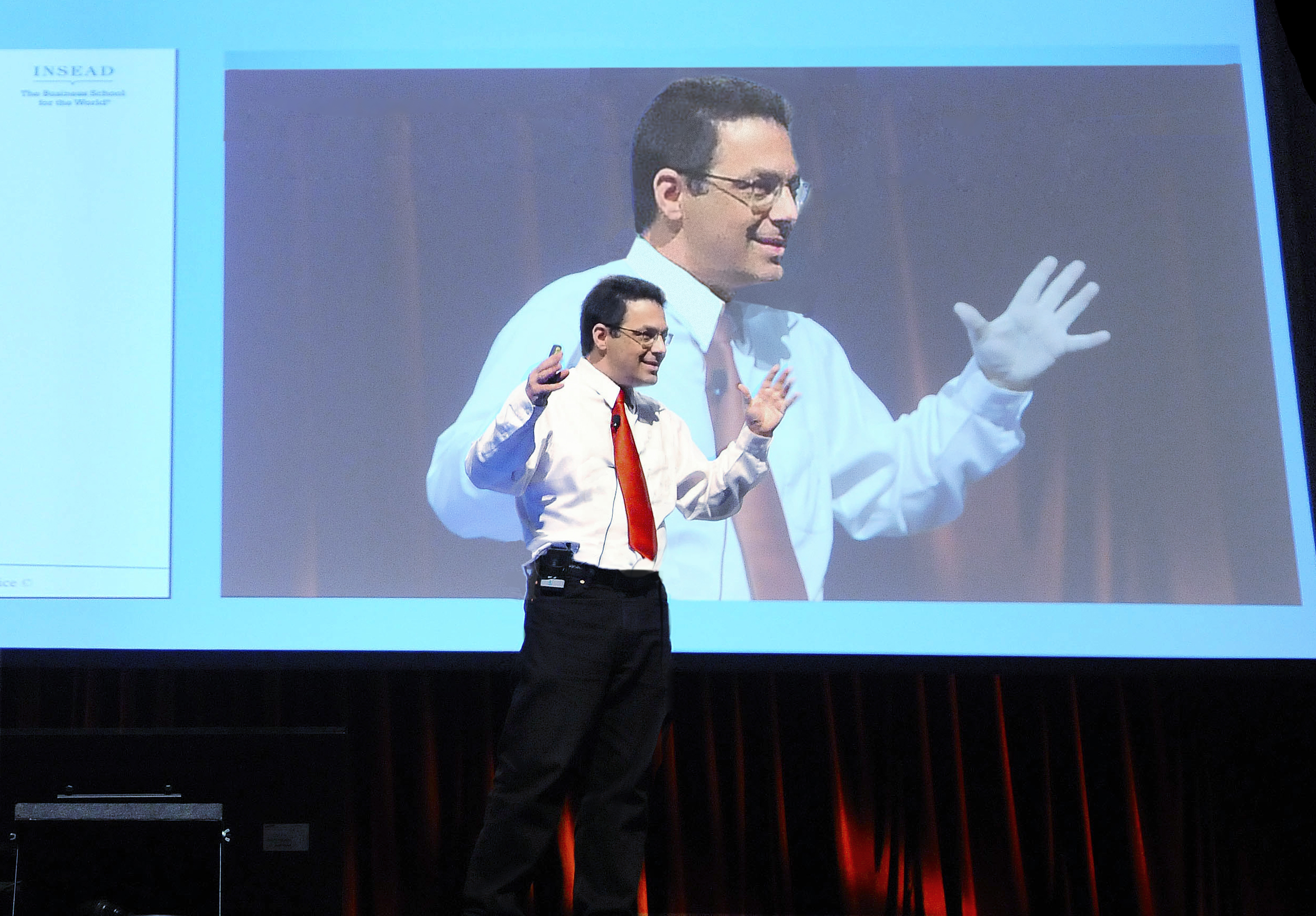
- Born: 11 November 1961 (age 64); Israel
- Education: University of California at Berkeley (Ph.D., 1993)
- Scientific career
- Fields: Customer Insight, Judgment & Decision Making, Marketing
- Workplaces: INSEAD
- Doctoral advisors: Daniel Kahneman; Itamar Simonson.

Ziv Carmon (Hebrew: זיו כרמון) is the dean of research, professor of business administration, and holder of The Alfred H. Heineken Chaired Professorship at INSEAD. An expert in human judgment and decision-making, he is best known for his research on placebo effects of commercial actions and on the endowment effect, and his presentations and teachings about Customer Insight.

== Career ==
After working in sales and business analysis in the corporate world, he studied in the United States at University of California at Berkeley, where he received his MS in Business Administration and his PhD with a thesis entitled The Contingent Nature of Consumers Assessments of the Quality of Products and Services under the guidance of Nobel Laureate Daniel Kahneman and Itamar Simonson. Carmon began his academic career at the Duke University in 1993 as assistant professor at the Fuqua School of Business, where in 1997 he became associate professor. In 2000 he moved to France, to teach at INSEAD, and moved in 2004 to Singapore.

Carmon is a frequent speaker at professional conferences and business events. His views on business frequently appear in international media outlets such as: New York Times, The Washington Post, Los Angeles Times, The New Yorker, Forbes, The Wall Street Journal, Financial Times, Scientific American, Popular Science, Bloomberg Businessweek, Newsweek, USA Today, HuffPost, The Boston Globe, International Herald Tribune, Marketing News, The Times (UK), The Guardian (UK), The Daily Telegraph (UK), Toronto Star, Newsweek, National Public Radio, MSNBC, ABC News, Channel 4 (UK), and numerous blogs.

== Awards and honors ==
Carmon's research on placebo effects of marketing actions won the 2010 William F. O'Dell Award (for long-term contribution to marketing theory, methodology, and/or practice), was runner-up for the 2006 Paul Green Award (for showing the most potential to contribute significantly to marketing research practice and research in marketing), and was also chosen as one of the top 50 management articles of 2005 by Emerald Management Reviews (awarded to the 50 most notable out of the 15,000 articles that year).

His papers on Indeterminacy and the Live TV, and on Option Attachment, were finalists for the 2009 and 2006 Journal of Consumer Research Best Article Awards.

In 2008 Carmon, along with his co-authors, Rebecca Waber, Dan Ariely and Baba Shiv, was awarded an Ig Nobel Prize in medicine for their research demonstrating that high-priced placebos are more effective than low-priced ones. Carmon serves as consulting editor for the Journal of Behavioral Decision Making, served as associate editor for the Journal of Marketing Research, and is a member of the editorial review boards of a variety of other major journals, such as the Journal of Consumer Research, the Journal of Consumer Psychology, and the International Journal of Research in Marketing.

Carmon has taught in many countries around the world, in degree programs (Executive MBA, MBA, and PhD), numerous executive-education-programs (company-specific-, in-house-, open-enrollment), and received a variety of awards for teaching excellence.

== Selected works ==
- Mazar, Asaf; Tomaino, Geoff; Carmon, Ziv; Wood, Wendy (2022). "Americans Under-Estimate the Effect of Friction on Voter Turnout". Proceedings of the National Academy of Sciences. 119 (34) e2206072119. doi:10.1073/pnas.2206072119. PMC 9407209. PMID 35969772. S2CID 8445279.
- Mazar, Asaf; Tomaino, Geoff; Carmon, Ziv; Wood, Wendy (2021). "Habits to Save our Habitat: Using Habit Psychology to Promote Sustainability". Behavioral Science & Policy. 7 (2): 75–100. doi:10.1353/bsp.2021.0014.
- Amar, Moty; Ariely, Dan; Carmon, Ziv; Yang, Haiyang (2018). "How Counterfeits Infect Genuine Products: The Role of Moral Disgust". Journal of Consumer Psychology. 28 (2): 329–343. doi:10.1002/jcpy.1036.
- Steinhart, Yael; Carmon, Ziv; Trope, Yaacov (2013). "Distant Warnings of Adverse Side-Effects can Backfire". Psychological Science. 24 (9): 1842–1847. doi:10.1177/0956797613478948. PMID 23912069. S2CID 8445279.
- Maddux, Will; Yang, Haiyang; Falk, Carl; Adam, Hajo; Adair, Wendi; Endo, Yumi; Carmon, Ziv; Heine, Steve (2010). "For Whom is Parting from Possessions More Painful: Cultural Differences in the Endowment Effect". Psychological Science. 21 (12): 1910–1917. doi:10.1177/0956797610388818. PMID 21097722. S2CID 16860986.
- Waber, Rebecca; Shiv, Baba; Carmon, Ziv; Ariely, Dan (2008). "Commercial Features of Placebo & Therapeutic Efficacy". JAMA: The Journal of the American Medical Association. 299 (9): 1016–17. doi:10.1001/jama.299.9.1016. PMID 18319411.
- Vosgerau, Joachim; Carmon, Ziv; Wertenbroch, Klaus (2006). "Indeterminacy and Live TV". Journal of Consumer Research. 32 (4): 487–495. doi:10.1086/500478.
- Shiv, Baba; Carmon, Ziv; Ariely, Dan (2005). "Placebo Effects of Marketing Actions: Consumers May Get What They Pay For". Journal of Marketing Research. 22 (4): 383–393. doi:10.1509/jmkr.2005.42.4.383. S2CID 14170707.
- Carmon, Ziv; Wertenbroch, Klaus; Zeelenberg, Marcel (2003). "Option Attachment: When Deliberating Makes Choosing Feel Like Losing" (PDF). Journal of Consumer Research. 30: 15–29. doi:10.1086/374701. S2CID 56209002.
- Carmon, Ziv; Ariely, Dan (2000). "Focusing on the Forgone: Why Value can Appear so Different to Buyers and Sellers". Journal of Consumer Research. 27 (3): 360–370. doi:10.1086/317590.
- Ariely, Dan; Carmon, Ziv (2000). "Gestalt Characteristics of Experiences: The Defining Features of Summarized Events". Journal of Behavioral Decision Making. 13 (2): 191–201. doi:10.1002/(sici)1099-0771(200004/06)13:2<191::aid-bdm330>3.0.co;2-a.
- Biyalogorsky, Eyal; Carmon, Ziv; Fruchter, Gila E.; Gerstner, Eitan (1999). "Research Note: Overselling with Opportunistic Cancellations". Marketing Science. 18 (4): 605–610. doi:10.1287/mksc.18.4.605.
- Fischer, Greg; Carmon, Ziv; Ariely, Dan; Zauberman, Gal (1999). "Goal-Based Construction of Preference: Task Goals & the Prominence Effect". Management Science. 45 (8): 1057–1075. doi:10.1287/mnsc.45.8.1057.
- Carmon, Ziv; Shanthikumar, George J.; Carmon, Tali (1995). "A Psychological Perspective on Service Segmentation: The Significance of Accounting for Consumers' Perceptions of Waiting and Service". Management Science. 41 (10): 1806–1815. doi:10.1287/mksc.13.1.23.
- Simonson, Itamar; Carmon, Ziv; O'Curry, Suzanne (1994). "Experimental Evidence on the Negative Effect of Product Features and Sales Promotions on Brand Choice". Marketing Science. 13 (1): 23–40. doi:10.1287/mksc.13.1.23.
