= Baba Shiv =

Marketing Professor

- Education: PhD, Duke Univ., 1996; MBA, Indian Inst. of Mgmt, Ahmedabad 1988; BE College of Eng, Guindy, Chennai, 1983
- Scientific career
- Fields: Studies in emotional brain, decision-making and motivation
- Workplaces: Professor of Marketing at the Stanford Graduate School of Business

Baba Shiv grew up in India and is an American marketing professor and an expert in the area of neuroeconomics. He is the Sanwa Bank, Limited, Professor of Marketing at Stanford Graduate School of Business, Stanford University. His work has been featured in The Tonight Show with Jay Leno, CNN, Fox Business, Financial Times, The New York Times and The Wall Street Journal. Shiv received his PhD from Duke University.

Professor Shiv researches how decision making and economic behavior are effected by neural structures and how brains create creativity. His public speaking events and extensive library of published research have been highly influential in the general understanding of the brain functions of creativity and motivation.

In 2010, Shiv won the American Marketing Association William F. O'Dell Award, which "recognizes the Journal of Marketing Research article that has made the most significant, long-term contribution to marketing theory, methodology, and/or practice." He won the award for his article "Placebo Effects of Marketing Actions: Consumers May Get What They Pay For", which demonstrated that high-priced placebos are more effective than low-priced ones. In 2008 Shiv, along with his co-authors, Ziv Carmon, Rebecca Waber, and Dan Ariely, was awarded an Ig Nobel Prize in medicine for the same research.

== Select articles that cite Baba Shiv ==
- The Wall Street Journal, How to Keep a Resolution: Forget Willpower, Reaching a Goal Means Retraining Brain to Form New Habits
- The Wall Street Journal, Blame It on the Brain: The latest neuroscience research suggests spreading resolutions out over time is the best approach
- The Wall Street Journal, To Lose Weight, Forget the Details
- The Wall Street Journal, Songs Stick in Teens' Heads: Research Shows Hit Songs Activate Pleasure, Reward Centers in Adolescent Brains
- The New York Times, More Expensive Placebos Bring More Relief
- The New York Times, What's My House Worth? And Now?
- Financial Times: Sleep monitor is a dream machine
- Financial Times, Something for the weekend: This week’s research roundup warns of the dangers of hypothetical questions
