= Charles Plott =

American economist

Charles Raymond Plott (born July 8, 1938) is an American economist. He is the William D. Hacker Professor of Economics and Political Science, Emeritus, at the California Institute of Technology, the former Director of the Laboratory for Experimental Economics and Political Science, and a pioneer in the field of experimental economics. His research is focused on the basic principles of process performance and the use of those principles in the design of new, decentralized processes to solve complex problems. Applications are found in mechanisms for allocating complex items such as the markets for pollution permits in Southern California, the FCC auction of licenses for Personal Communication Systems, the auctions for electric power in California, the allocation of landing rights at the major U.S. airports, access of private trains to public railway tracks, access to natural gas pipelines, the allocation of licenses for offshore aquaculture sites, the combinatorial sale of fleets of vehicles, and the application of complex procurements. In the 1970s, Plott developed laboratory experimental methods for economics and political science and produced experiments that helped establish laboratory testing of economic and political theories.

== Awards and memberships ==
Plott was elected to the National Academy of Sciences in 2007 and was named a Distinguished Fellow of the American Economic Association in 2008.

Recent awards include the 1994 Journal of Finance Markets Award, the 2003 Journal of Financial Markets Best Paper Award, the 2004 GSAM Quant Best Paper Prize from Review of Finance, the 2006 Economic Inquiry Best Article Award, and the 2006 GAIM Research Paper of the Year Award.

Charles Plott has held the positions of president of the Society for the Advancement of Economic Theory, president of the Western Economic Association International, and others.

== Professional appointments ==
Plott's professional appointments include: National Research Council's Committee on Proposed Revisions to the Common Rule in Relation to Behavioral and Social Sciences; Economic Theory - Member, Editorial Board; Chairman, California Institute of Technology Institutional Review Board, National Research Council's Commission on Behavioral and Social Sciences and Education – Board on Behavioral, cognitive, and Sensory Sciences; The Lee Center for Advanced Networking, as well as others.

2002 Nobel Laureate Vernon L. Smith lauded Plott in his speech of thanks at the Nobel Banquet, December 10, 2002 with a toast to "The pioneering influence of Sidney Siegel, Amos Tversky, Martin Shubik, and Charles Plott on the intellectual movement that culminated in the economics award for 2002." In addition, the prize committee recognized Plott's contribution to the field.

== Education ==
Plott received his education from the University of Virginia, PhD; Oklahoma State University, M.S., B.S.

== Books ==
Plott is the author of numerous scholarly books and publications. A selection is:

- The Allocation of Scarce Resources: Experimental Economics and the Problem of Allocating Airport Slots, D. M. Grether, R. Mark Isaac, and C.R. Plott,. Volume in series Underground Classics in Economics, K. Arrow, J. Heckman, P. Pechman, T. Sargent, and R. Solow, editors. Boulder, CO: Westview Press, 1989.
- Designer Markets: Laboratory Experimental Methods in Economics, Volume 4, Number 1, 1994, Economic Theory. Charles R. Plott, guest editor.
- Public Economics, Political Processes and Policy Applications. Collected Papers on the Experimental Foundations of Economics and Political Science, Volume One. Cheltenham, UK: Edward Elgar Publishing (2001).
- Market Institutions and Price Discovery. Collected Papers on the Experimental Foundations of Economics and Political Science, Volume Two. Cheltenham, UK: Edward Elgar Publishing (2001).
- Information, Finance and General Equilibrium. Collected Papers on the Experimental Foundations of Economics and Political Science, Volume Three. Cheltenham, UK: Edward Elgar Publishing (2001).
- Handbook of Experimental Economic Results, Volume 1. Edited by C. R. Plott and V.L. Smith, Elsevier North-Holland Publishing (2008).

== Patents ==
1. Amusement devices and games including means for processing electronic data where ultimate outcome of the game is dependent on relative odds of a card combination and/or where chance is a factor: expected biases such as long shot and favorite bias, (2011).
