= Dan Ariely =

Israeli-American professor of psychology and behavioral economics (born 1967)

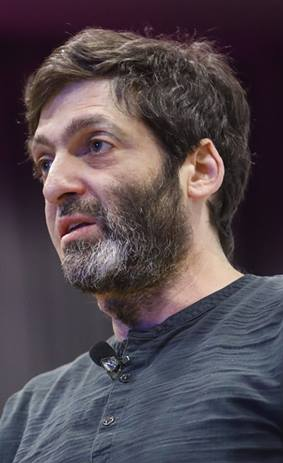
- Ariely in 2019
- Born: April 29, 1967 (age 59); New York City, New York, U.S.
- Education: Tel Aviv University (BA); University of North Carolina, Chapel Hill (MA, PhD); Duke University (PhD)
- Scientific career
- Fields: Behavioral economics; Decision making
- Workplaces: Duke University; Massachusetts Institute of Technology
- Doctoral advisor: James Bettman; John Lynch
- Website: Official website

Dan Ariely (Hebrew: דן אריאלי; born April 29, 1967) is an Israeli-American author and professor of business administration at Duke University. He is the co-founder of several companies implementing insights from behavioral science. Ariely wrote an advice column called "Ask Ariely" in The Wall Street Journal from June 2012 until September 2022. He is the author of the three New York Times best-selling books Predictably Irrational, The Upside of Irrationality, and The Honest Truth about Dishonesty. He co-produced the 2015 documentary (Dis)Honesty: The Truth About Lies. Ariely's life, research, and book Predictably Irrational inspired the 2023 NBC television series The Irrational.

Since 2021, the accuracy of Ariely's studies has been called into question, with two articles retracted, two expressions of concern, several replication failures and allegations of data manipulation and fraud.

== Family and personal life ==
Dan Ariely was born to Yoram and Dafna Ariely in New York City while his father was studying for an MBA at Columbia University. He has two younger sisters. The family emigrated to Israel when he was three years old. He grew up in Ramat Hasharon.

In his senior year of high school, Ariely was active in Hanoar Haoved Vehalomed, an Israeli youth movement affiliated with the Labor Zionist movement. While he was preparing a ktovet esh (fire inscription) for a traditional nighttime ceremony, the flammable materials he was mixing exploded, causing third-degree burns to over 70 percent of his body. In his writings entitled "Painful Lessons", Ariely described his hospitalization and treatments, detailing how that experience led to his research on "how to better deliver painful and unavoidable treatments to patients".

Ariely was previously married to Sumedha (Sumi) Gupta in 1998; they have two children.

After a second manuscript of his was retracted for containing fabricated data, it was reported that Ariely is seeking political office under the banner of the Pirate Party of Israel.

== Education and academic career ==
Ariely was a physics and mathematics major at Tel Aviv University but transferred to philosophy and psychology. In his last year, he dropped philosophy and concentrated solely on psychology, graduating in 1991. In 1994, he earned a master's degree in cognitive psychology and two years later a Ph.D. from the University of North Carolina at Chapel Hill. He completed a second Ph.D. in business administration at Duke University in 1998, at the urging of Daniel Kahneman. Ariely taught at MIT between 1998 and 2008, where he was the Alfred P. Sloan professor of behavioral economics. Ariely was also part of the MIT Media Lab. In 2008, he returned to Duke University as the James B. Duke Professor of psychology and behavioral economics. His laboratory at Duke, the Center for Advanced Hindsight, pursues research in subjects like the psychology of money, decision making by physicians and patients, cheating, and social justice.

In July 2021, the journal Psychological Science challenged a 2004 paper by James Heyman and Ariely, "prompted by some uncertainty regarding the values of statistical tests reported in the article and the analytic approach taken to the data". The authors were unable to resolve the ambiguities, because the original participant-level data was no longer available. A follow-up analysis, and a letter to the editor by Gregory Francis from the Department of Psychological Sciences, Purdue University, demonstrated that the problem in the paper could be a simple reporting error in which t-statistics were reported as F-statistics by mistake. Francis also showed that this error does not negate the findings in the original article.

According to Google Scholar, as of November 2025, Ariely had garnered more than 75,000 citations, and his h-index stood at 107.

== Research ==
Ariely's research is in the area of consumer behavior, and he studies how people often make irrational decisions. Below are some common themes.

Critique of classical economic assumptions and consumer behavior

Ariely has challenged the assumptions of classical economics by showing that consumer valuations are influenced by arbitrary anchors and external cues. His research on the "Zero Price Effect" demonstrates how free products distort perceived value beyond rational cost-benefit logic.

Dishonesty and ethics

His studies have shown that people rationalize small acts of dishonesty to maintain a positive self-image, thus balancing moral integrity with personal gain.

Emotional influence on economic decisions

Ariely has examined how emotions like love or anger distort rational decision-making and self-control. His experiments have shown that emotional states can lead to riskier or less ethical economic choices.

Workplace motivation

Ariely's research found that meaning, recognition, and purpose drive productivity more than financial incentives. In studies conducted with Intel, he found that overreliance on monetary rewards can lead to reduced motivation in the long term.

== Controversies and criticism ==
In 2006, when he was a professor at the MIT Media Lab, Ariely conducted experiments including administering electric shocks with a research assistant who had no human-subject training. As a consequence, MIT's ethics committee banned Ariely from supervising data collection for a year. Ariely confirmed this and said that he was not aware that the research assistant did not have the needed one-hour online human-subject training.

In 2021, a 2012 paper written by Francesca Gino, Max H. Bazerman, Nina Mazar, Lisa L Shu, and Ariely was discovered to be based on falsified data and was subsequently retracted. In 2024, Ariely told Business Insider that Duke had completed a three-year investigation that, according to him, concluded that data from the paper had been falsified but found no evidence that Ariely had used fake data knowingly. Duke University declined to comment on the grounds that their procedure is not to comment. In a 2024 LinkedIn article posted to his account, Ariely argued that he was able to replicate the findings in two papers he co-authored.

In November 2022, the Israeli TV investigative show Hamakor (Channel 13), aired an episode questioning a number of Ariely's studies that were not reproducible or whose reliability was dubious in terms of the way they were carried out, the data collected, or whether the studies were carried out at all. For example, Ariely claimed that data for his "Ten Commandments" study were collected in 2004–2005 at UCLA with the assistance of Aimee Drolet Rossi. However, despite being thanked in the 2004 paper for collecting the data almost 20 years later, Rossi denies having run the study, and UCLA has issued a statement that the study did not take place there.

Ariely told The New Yorker that the surveys were collected at UCLA but processed by an assistant at MIT, a mixup that he credited for the confusion surrounding Rossi and UCLA's role in the study. An analysis conducted by the American Marketing Association on the study in question found that the study's results were largely replicable using the data provided by the authors, although conditions had been dropped from the first two experiments in the study.

In August 2026, Kyle Hyndman and Alberto Bisin published a replication in Psychological Science of Study 2 from Ariely and Klaus Wertenbroch's 2002 article "Procrastination, Deadlines, and Performance: Self-Control by Precommitment". Their newly collected data did not reproduce the original results: changes in deadline conditions had negligible effects on the three performance measures and several survey measures, and evenly spaced externally imposed deadlines were not especially effective at reducing procrastination. On August 31, 2026, Data Colada researchers Uri Simonsohn, Joe Simmons, and Leif Nelson published an analysis of spreadsheet files that Hyndman said he had received from Ariely's MIT email account in 2006; they reported duplicated observations and several other statistical patterns that they considered inconsistent with genuine data and concluded that the data for Study 2 had been tampered with or fabricated. Ariely had stated earlier that month that he had been informed that the data underlying the paper contained "serious anomalies", that the surviving documentary record and his memory were insufficient to resolve the questions raised, and that he and Wertenbroch were cooperating with the journal's review and retraction processes. Data Colada reported that Wertenbroch had asked the editor to retract the 2002 article, and it was retracted on September 2, 2026.

=== Relationship with Jeffrey Epstein ===
In January 2026, the United States Department of Justice released around 3 million documents from the FBI’s investigation into Jeffrey Epstein, in which Ariely’s name appears several hundred times. The records show that Ariely corresponded with Epstein over several years and met with him in New York. The New York Times reported that the correspondence included Ariely seeking funding for a 2014 film project. In one 2012 email, Ariely asked Epstein for the contact details of a “redhead” he had met.The Duke Chronicle noted that the records did not allege criminal or unethical conduct by Ariely.

In a February 2026 column in The Duke Chronicle, Ariely said he first met Epstein to discuss possible funding for his lab, but received none after concluding that Epstein’s interests did not align with his research. He said he later met with Epstein again in New York out of research interest. He told The New York Times that he was studying dishonesty and crime at the time and spoke with many people who had broken the law. He said the woman in the 2012 email was someone he had met at a professional conference and believed to be Epstein’s colleague. He described his contact with Epstein as “infrequent, largely logistical, often mediated by assistants,” and stated that there was no financial, professional, or ongoing relationship. He also told the Times that the relationship “wasn’t a friendship.”

== Professional ventures and affiliations ==
Early in his career, Ariely co-founded the behavioral economics consulting firm BEworks, which was acquired by Kyu in 2017.

In 2012, aspiring to develop a time management app that helps people "use time better" and avoid procrastination, Ariely co-founded Timeful with Yoav Shoham and Jacob Bank. The app was acquired by Google in 2015.

In 2013, Ariely and Kristen Berman co-founded Irrational Labs, a consulting firm aimed at applying behavioral economics to consumer behavior and decision-making.

In 2014, Ariely co-founded the kitchen appliance company Genie with Ayelet Carasso-Stenberg and Doron Marco. Genie manufactures a food "replicator" that cooks freeze-dried meals in cartridges.

In 2015, Ariely invested in Qapital, a personal finance app, and was appointed as its chief behavioral economist. He was later named chair of the board.

In 2015, Ariely gave a talk at Google about dating and relationships, discussing what women want from men, including how women's attraction to men varies depending where they are in their menstrual cycle. This was one of many talks Ariely collaborated with Google on over several years, including, for example, a talk about how people rationalize cheating.

In 2016, he took on the position of chief behavioral officer at Lemonade, an insurance company that integrates aspects of behavioral economics into its insurance model.

Ariely's entrepreneurial ventures also include founding Shapa in 2017, a company focused on health monitoring and behavior change. After founding Shapa, Ariely also co-founded the hedge fund Irrational Capital and its associated Clear Motivation Index. For the company, Ariely developed an index measuring human capital based on factors such as motivation and benefits, and created several ETFs based on human capital factor, including the funds listed as HAPI and HAPS.

== Media ==
Ariely has appeared in several documentary films and television productions.

In 2011, he worked on the documentary The Flaw, which investigates the causes of the 2008 financial crisis. In it, Ariely explained and presented scientific data on the forces that shape human behavior, motivation, and decision-making.

In 2015, Ariely appeared in another documentary, (Dis)Honesty: The Truth About Lies. It explores three key themes: why people lie, how often they do it, and the consequences of dishonest behavior.

Ariely contributed to Boom Bust Boom, a 2015 documentary about economic crashes.

In 2019, he appeared in The Inventor: Out for Blood in Silicon Valley, a documentary that tracks the rise and fall of Theranos.

In 2022, he contributed to Why Like This? Lama Kacha, a Hebrew television series broadcast on Kan 11. In it, Ariely distilled complex scientific concepts and provided accessible explanations for the forces that shape human behavior, motivation, and decision-making.

Ariely has also presented talks at several TED, with titles such as "Our Buggy Moral Code" and "Unraveling the Mysteries of Human Behavior".

=== "Ask Ariely" WSJ advice column ===
From June 2012 to September 2022, Ariely contributed a weekly advice column titled "Ask Ariely" to The Wall Street Journal.

=== The Irrational TV show ===
Ariely's life, research, and best-selling book Predictably Irrational: The Hidden Forces That Shape Our Decisions inspired the NBC television series The Irrational, which premiered on September 25, 2023. The show's protagonist, Professor Alec Mercer, who is portrayed by Jesse L. Martin, was based on Ariely.

=== (Dis)Honesty: The Truth About Lies ===
Directed by Yael Melamede and released in 2015, (Dis)Honesty: The Truth About Lies is a documentary film exploring dishonesty in contemporary society. Ariely presents the film, offering analysis on the psychological mechanisms that drive deceit. With references to behavioral experiments and anecdotes—from athletic and academic cheating to political scandals—Ariely draws on his research on behavioural economics and irrationality to shed light on why and how people lie. Numerous people make appearances in the documentary, including the author and marketer Ryan Holiday, to share their personal experiences with dishonesty and lies.

=== The Adventures of Professor D ===
In 2026, Ariely published a children's graphic novel titled Professor D Takes Control, illustrated by Omer Hoffman. It is the first in a planned three-part series. The book is about a character named Professor D, who "gets into all kinds of trouble" and "uses social science" to get out of it.

== Honors ==
In 2015, Ariely received an honorary doctorate from Erasmus University Rotterdam. He is also a two-time recipient of the William F. O'Dell Award for articles he co-authored. In 2008, Ariely, along with his co-authors, Rebecca Waber, Ziv Carmon, and Baba Shiv, was awarded an Ig Nobel Prize in medicine for their research demonstrating that "high-priced fake medicine is more effective than low-priced fake medicine".

== Bibliography ==
=== Books ===
- Predictably Irrational: The Hidden Forces That Shape Our Decisions (2008; second edition in 2012). HarperCollins. ISBN 9780061353239
- The Upside of Irrationality (2010). HarperCollins. ISBN 9780062008565
- The Honest Truth about Dishonesty: How We Lie to Everyone – Especially Ourselves (2012; second edition in 2013). HarperCollins. ISBN 9780062298553
- Behavioral Economics Saved My Dog: Life Advice for the Imperfect Human (2015). Oneworld. ISBN 9781780748177
- Irrationally Yours: On Missing Socks, Pick-up Lines, and Other Existential Puzzles (2015). HarperCollins. ISBN 9780062380012
- Payoff: The Hidden Logic That Shapes Our Motivations (2016). Simon & Schuster / TED. ISBN 9781501120053
- Dollars and Sense: How We Misthink Money and How to Spend Smarter (2017). Co-authored with Jeff Kreisler. HarperCollins. ISBN 9780062651228
- Small Change: Money Mishaps and How to Avoid Them (2018). Co-authored with Jeff Kreisler. Pan Macmillan. ISBN 9781509889167
- Amazing Decisions: The Illustrated Guide to Improving Business Deals and Family Meals (2019, illustrated by Matt R. Trower), Farrar, Straus and Giroux.ISBN 9781466899544
- Misbelief: What Makes Rational People Believe Irrational Things (2023), Bonnier Books UK. ISBN 9781785120787
- Professor D Takes Control (2026). Charlesbridge. ISBN 978-1-62354-792-9

=== Selected publications ===
- Ariely, Dan; Loewenstein, George; Prelec, Drazen (2003), "Coherent Arbitrariness: Stable demand curves without stable preferences", The Quarterly Journal of Economics, 118 (1): 73–106, doi:10.1162/00335530360535153, archived from the original on April 4, 2012
- Ariely, Dan (2000), "Controlling information flow: Effects on consumers' decision making and preference", Journal of Consumer Research, 27 (2): 233–248, doi:10.1086/314322
- Ariely, Dan; Wertenbroch, Klaus (2002), "Procrastination, Deadlines, and Performance: Self-Control by Precommitment" (PDF), Psychological Science, 13 (3): 219–224, doi:10.1111/1467-9280.00441, PMID 12009041, S2CID 3025329
- Heyman, James; Ariely, Dan (2004), "Effort for Payment: A Tale of Two markets" (PDF), Psychological Science, 15 (11): 787–793(7), doi:10.1111/j.0956-7976.2004.00757.x, PMID 15482452, S2CID 8573184
- Carmon, Ziv; Ariely, Dan (2000), "Focusing on the Forgone: Why Value can Appear so Different to Buyers and Sellers" (PDF), Journal of Consumer Research, 27 (3): 360–370, doi:10.1086/317590
- Shiv, Baba; Carmon, Ziv; Ariely, Dan (2005), "Placebo Effects of Marketing Actions: Consumers May Get What They Pay For" (PDF), Journal of Marketing Research, XXII (4): 383–393, doi:10.1509/jmkr.2005.42.4.383, S2CID 14170707
- Mazar, Nina; Ariely, Dan (2006), "Dishonesty in Everyday Life and Its Policy Implications" (PDF), Journal of Public Policy & Marketing, 25 (1): 117–126, doi:10.1509/jppm.25.1.117, S2CID 2813683
- Lee, Leonard; Frederick, Shane; Ariely, Dan (2006), "Try it, you'll like it: The influence of expectation, consumption, and revelation on preferences for beer" (PDF), Psychological Science, 17 (12): 1054–1058, doi:10.1111/j.1467-9280.2006.01829.x, PMID 17201787, S2CID 1252769
- Ariely, Dan; Gregory S. Berns (March 3, 2010). "Neuromarketing: the hope and hype of neuroimaging in business" (PDF). Nature Reviews Neuroscience. 11 (4): 284–292. doi:10.1038/nrn2795. PMC 2875927. PMID 20197790. Archived from the original (PDF) on July 11, 2013.
- Ariely, Dan; Michael I. Norton; Daniel Mochon (July 2012). "The IKEA effect: When labor leads to love" (PDF). Journal of Consumer Psychology. 3. 22 (3): 453–460. doi:10.1016/j.jcps.2011.08.002. Archived from the original (PDF) on May 20, 2014.
