= Behavioral economics =

Factors influencing economic decisions

Behavioral economics is the study of the psychological (e.g. cognitive, behavioral, affective, social) factors involved in the decisions of individuals or institutions, and how these decisions deviate from those implied by traditional economic theory.

Behavioral economics is primarily concerned with the bounds of rationality of economic agents. Behavioral models typically integrate insights from psychology, neuroscience and microeconomic theory.

Behavioral economics began as a distinct field of study in the 1970s and 1980s, but can be traced back to 18th-century economists, such as Adam Smith, who deliberated how the economic behavior of individuals could be influenced by their desires.

The status of behavioral economics as a subfield of economics is a fairly recent development; the breakthroughs that laid the foundation for it were published through the last three decades of the 20th century. Behavioral economics is still growing as a field, being used increasingly in research and in teaching.

== History ==
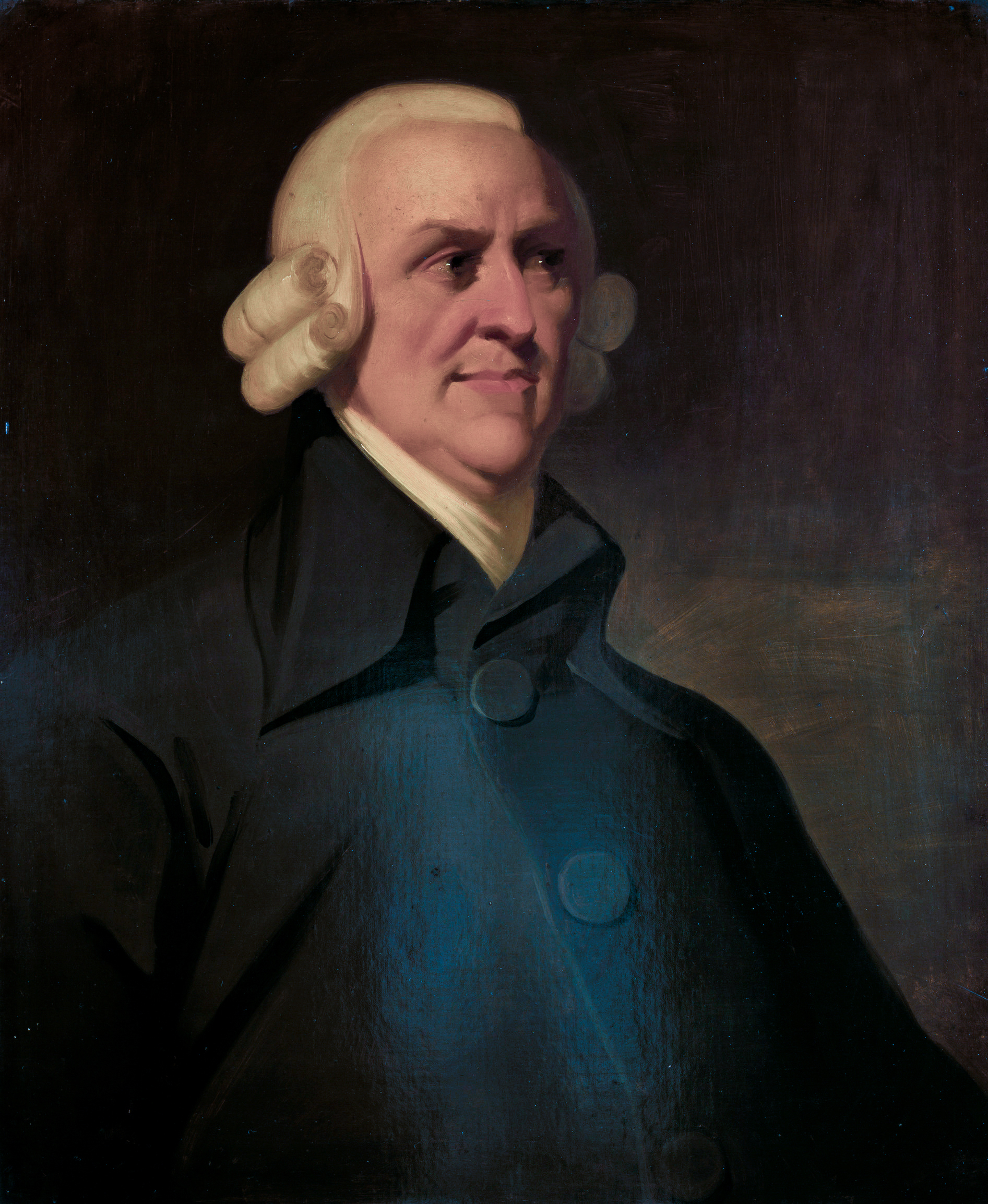
Adam Smith, author of The Wealth of Nations (1776) and The Theory of Moral Sentiments (1759)

Early classical economists included psychological reasoning in much of their writing, though psychology at the time was not a recognized field of study. In The Theory of Moral Sentiments, Adam Smith wrote on concepts later popularized by modern Behavioral Economic theory, such as loss aversion. Jeremy Bentham, a Utilitarian philosopher in the 1700s conceptualized utility as a product of psychology. Other economists who incorporated psychological explanations in their works included Francis Edgeworth, Vilfredo Pareto and Irving Fisher.

A rejection and elimination of psychology from economics in the early 1900s brought on a period defined by a reliance on empiricism. There was a lack of confidence in hedonic theories, which saw pursuance of maximum benefit as an essential aspect in understanding human economic behavior. Hedonic analysis had shown little success in predicting human behavior, leading many to question its viability as a reliable source for prediction.

There was also a fear among economists that the involvement of psychology in shaping economic models was inordinate and a departure from accepted principles. They feared that an increased emphasis on psychology would undermine the mathematic components of the field.

To boost the ability of economics to predict accurately, economists started looking to tangible phenomena rather than theories based on human psychology. Psychology was seen as unreliable to many of these economists as it was a new field, not regarded as sufficiently scientific. Though a number of scholars expressed concern towards the positivism within economics, models of study dependent on psychological insights became rare. Economists instead conceptualized humans as purely rational and self-interested decision makers, illustrated in the concept of homo economicus.

The resurgence of psychology within economics, which facilitated the expansion of behavioral economics, has been linked to the cognitive revolution. In the 1960s, cognitive psychology began to shed more light on the brain as an information processing device (in contrast to behaviorist models). Psychologists in this field, such as Ward Edwards, Amos Tversky and Daniel Kahneman began to compare their cognitive models of decision-making under risk and uncertainty to economic models of rational behavior. These developments spurred economists to reconsider how psychology could be applied to economic models and theories. Concurrently, the Expected utility hypothesis and discounted utility models began to gain acceptance. In challenging the accuracy of generic utility, these concepts established a practice foundational in behavioral economics: Building on standard models by applying psychological knowledge.

Mathematical psychology reflects a long-standing interest in preference transitivity and the measurement of utility.

=== Development of behavioral economics ===
In 2017, Niels Geiger, a lecturer in economics at the University of Hohenheim conducted an investigation into the proliferation of behavioral economics. Geiger's research looked at studies that had quantified the frequency of references to terms specific to behavioral economics, and how often influential papers in behavioral economics were cited in journals on economics. The quantitative study found that there was a significant spread in behavioral economics after Kahneman and Tversky's work in the 1990s and into the 2000s.

Citation Frequency in economic journals for Kahneman and Tversky's studies on behavioral economics by 5-year periods
| | 1979 paper | 1992 paper | 1974 paper | 1981 paper | 1986 paper |
|---|---|---|---|---|---|
| 1974–78 | 0 | 0 | 1 | 0 | 0 |
| 1979–83 | 1 | 0 | 4 | 3 | 0 |
| 1984–88 | 7 | 0 | 0 | 1 | 0 |
| 1989–93 | 19 | 1 | 2 | 6 | 3 |
| 1993–98 | 37 | 16 | 12 | 7 | 6 |
| 1999–2003 | 51 | 20 | 5 | 15 | 11 |
| 2004–08 | 80 | 48 | 18 | 15 | 16 |
| 2009–13 | 161 | 110 | 59 | 38 | 19 |
| Total Citations | 356 | 195 | 101 | 85 | 55 |

== Bounded rationality ==
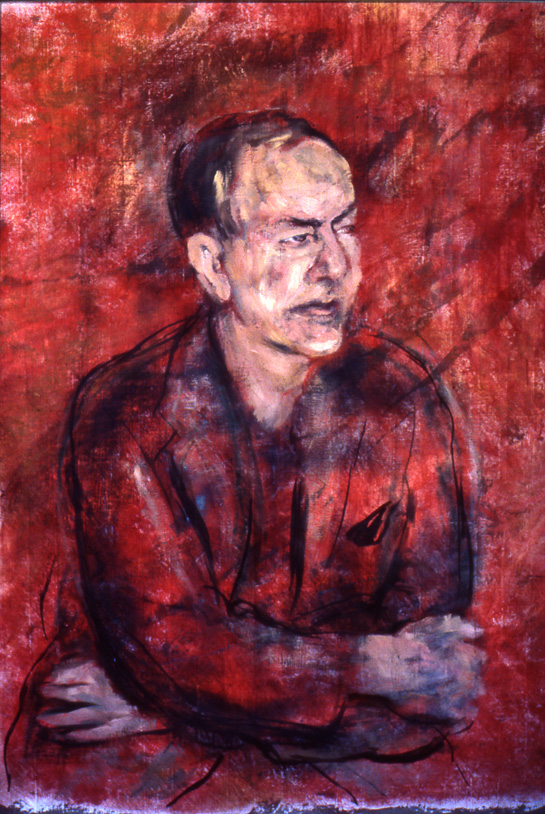
Herbert A. Simon, winner of the 1975 Turing award, the 1978 Nobel Prize in economics, and the 1988 John von Neumann Theory Prize

Bounded rationality is the idea that when individuals make decisions, their rationality is limited by the tractability of the decision problem, their cognitive limitations and the time available.

Herbert A. Simon proposed bounded rationality as an alternative basis for the mathematical modeling of decision-making. It complements "rationality as optimization", which views decision-making as a fully rational process of finding an optimal choice given the information available. Simon used the analogy of a pair of scissors, where one blade represents human cognitive limitations and the other the "structures of the environment", illustrating how minds compensate for limited resources by exploiting known structural regularity in the environment. Bounded rationality implicates the idea that humans take shortcuts that may lead to suboptimal decision-making. Behavioral economists engage in mapping the decision shortcuts that agents use in order to help increase the effectiveness of human decision-making. Bounded rationality finds that actors do not assess all available options appropriately, in order to save on search and deliberation costs. As such decisions are not always made in the sense of greatest self-reward as limited information is available. Instead agents shall choose to settle for an acceptable solution. One approach, adopted by Richard M. Cyert and James G. March in their 1963 book A Behavioral Theory of the Firm, was to view firms as coalitions of groups whose targets were based on satisficing rather than optimizing behaviour. Another treatment of this idea comes from Cass Sunstein and Richard Thaler's Nudge. Sunstein and Thaler recommend that choice architectures are modified in light of human agents' bounded rationality. A widely cited proposal from Sunstein and Thaler urges that healthier food be placed at sight level in order to increase the likelihood that a person will opt for that choice instead of less healthy option. Some critics of Nudge have lodged attacks that modifying choice architectures will lead to people becoming worse decision-makers.

== Prospect theory ==
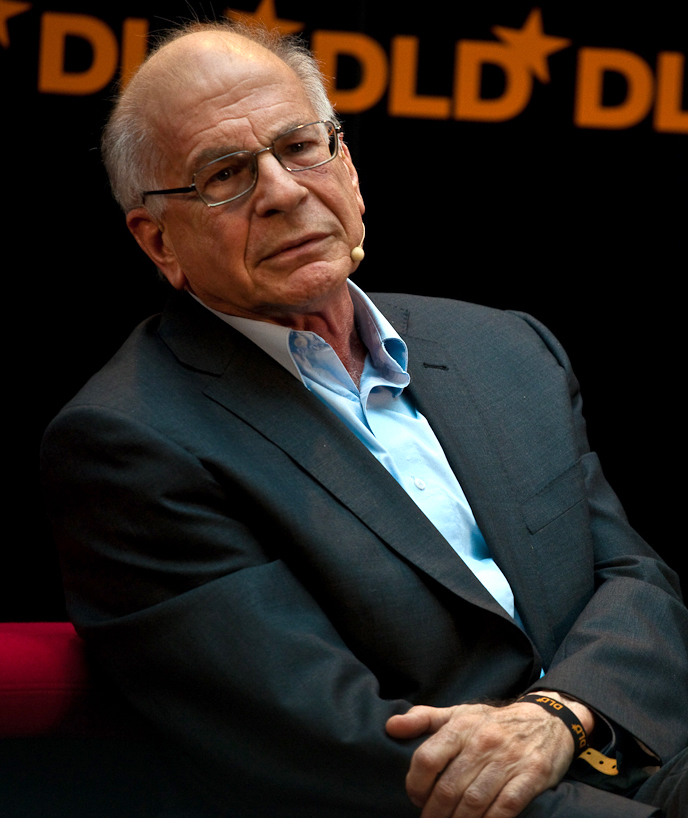
Daniel Kahneman, winner of the 2002 Nobel Prize in economics

In 1979, Kahneman and Tversky published Prospect Theory: An Analysis of Decision Under Risk, that used cognitive psychology to explain various divergences of economic decision making from neo-classical theory. Kahneman and Tversky utilising prospect theory determined three generalisations; gains are treated differently than losses, outcomes received with certainty are overweighed relative to uncertain outcomes and the structure of the problem may affect choices. These arguments were supported in part by altering a survey question so that it was no longer a case of achieving gains but averting losses and the majority of respondents altered their answers accordingly. In essence proving that emotions such as fear of loss, or greed can alter decisions, indicating the presence of an irrational decision-making process. Prospect theory has two stages: an editing stage and an evaluation stage. In the editing stage, risky situations are simplified using various heuristics. In the evaluation phase, risky alternatives are evaluated using various psychological principles that include:

- Reference dependence: When evaluating outcomes, the decision maker considers a "reference level". Outcomes are then compared to the reference point and classified as "gains" if greater than the reference point and "losses" if less than the reference point.
- Loss aversion: Losses are avoided more than equivalent gains are sought. In their 1992 paper, Kahneman and Tversky found the median coefficient of loss aversion to be about 2.25, i.e., losses hurt about 2.25 times more than equivalent gains reward.
- Non-linear probability weighting: Decision makers overweigh small probabilities and underweigh large probabilities – this gives rise to the inverse-S shaped "probability weighting function".
- Diminishing sensitivity to gains and losses: As the size of the gains and losses relative to the reference point increase in absolute value, the marginal effect on the decision maker's utility or satisfaction falls.

In 1992, in the Journal of Risk and Uncertainty, Kahneman and Tversky gave a revised account of prospect theory that they called cumulative prospect theory. The new theory eliminated the editing phase in prospect theory and focused just on the evaluation phase. Its main feature was that it allowed for non-linear probability weighting in a cumulative manner, which was originally suggested in John Quiggin's rank-dependent utility theory. Psychological traits such as overconfidence, projection bias and the effects of limited attention are now part of the theory. Other developments include a conference at the University of Chicago, a special behavioral economics edition of the Quarterly Journal of Economics ("In Memory of Amos Tversky"), and Kahneman's 2002 Nobel Prize for having "integrated insights from psychological research into economic science, especially concerning human judgment and decision-making under uncertainty."

A further argument of Behavioural Economics relates to the impact of the individual's cognitive limitations as a factor in limiting the rationality of people's decisions. Sloan first argued this in his paper 'Bounded Rationality' where he stated that our cognitive limitations are somewhat the consequence of our limited ability to foresee the future, hampering the rationality of decision. Daniel Kahneman further expanded upon the effect cognitive ability and processes have on decision making in his book Thinking, Fast and Slow. He delved into two forms of thought: fast thinking, which he considered "operates automatically and quickly, with little or no effort and no sense of voluntary control", and slow thinking, the allocation of cognitive ability, choice, and concentration. Fast thinking utilises heuristics, or shortcuts, which provide an immediate but often irrational and imperfect solution. He proposed that hindsight bias, confirmation bias, and outcome bias (among others) originate from such shortcuts. A key example of fast thinking and the resultant irrational decisions is the 2008 financial crisis.

== Nudge theory ==
Nudge is a concept in behavioral science, political theory and economics which proposes designs or changes in decision environments as ways to influence the behavior and decision making of groups or individuals – in other words, it's "a way to manipulate people's choices to lead them to make specific decisions".

The first formulation of the term and associated principles was developed in cybernetics by James Wilk before 1995 and described by Brunel University academic D. J. Stewart as "the art of the nudge" (sometimes referred to as micronudges). It also drew on methodological influences from clinical psychotherapy tracing back to Gregory Bateson, including contributions from Milton Erickson, Watzlawick, Weakland and Fisch, and Bill O'Hanlon. In this variant, the nudge is a microtargeted design geared towards a specific group of people, irrespective of the scale of intended intervention.

In 2008, Richard Thaler and Cass Sunstein's book Nudge: Improving Decisions About Health, Wealth, and Happiness brought nudge theory to prominence. It also gained a following among US and UK politicians, in the private sector and in public health. The authors refer to influencing behavior without coercion as libertarian paternalism and the influencers as choice architects. Thaler and Sunstein defined their concept as:

A nudge, as we will use the term, is any aspect of the choice architecture that alters people's behavior in a predictable way without forbidding any options or significantly changing their economic incentives. To count as a mere nudge, the intervention must be easy and cheap to avoid. Nudges are not mandates. Putting fruit at eye level counts as a nudge. Banning junk food does not.

Nudging techniques aim to capitalise on the judgemental heuristics of people. In other words, a nudge alters the environment so that when heuristic, or System 1, decision-making is used, the resulting choice will be the most positive or desired outcome. An example of such a nudge is switching the placement of junk food in a store, so that fruit and other healthy options are located next to the cash register, while junk food is relocated to another part of the store.

In 2008, the United States appointed Sunstein, who helped develop the theory, as administrator of the Office of Information and Regulatory Affairs.

Notable applications of nudge theory include the formation of the British Behavioural Insights Team in 2010. It is often called the "Nudge Unit", at the British Cabinet Office, headed by David Halpern. In addition, the Penn Medicine Nudge Unit is the world's first behavioral design team embedded within a health system.

Nudge theory has also been applied to business management and corporate culture, such as in relation to health, safety and environment (HSE) and human resources. Regarding its application to HSE, one of the primary goals of nudge is to achieve a "zero accident culture".

In contrast to nudges, which aim to guide people toward better decisions, Richard Thaler and Cass Sunstein also introduced the concept of sludge, which refers to unnecessary frictions or barriers that make it harder for individuals to take beneficial actions – such as confusing forms or hidden fees.

=== Criticisms ===
Cass Sunstein has responded to critiques at length in his The Ethics of Influence making the case in favor of nudging against charges that nudges diminish autonomy, threaten dignity, violate liberties, or reduce welfare. Ethicists have debated this rigorously. These charges have been made by various participants in the debate from Bovens to Goodwin. Wilkinson for example charges nudges for being manipulative, while others such as Yeung question their scientific credibility.

Some, such as Hausman & Welch have inquired whether nudging should be permissible on grounds of (distributive) justice; Lepenies & Malecka have questioned whether nudges are compatible with the rule of law. Similarly, legal scholars have discussed the role of nudges and the law.

Behavioral economists such as Bob Sugden have pointed out that the underlying normative benchmark of nudging is still homo economicus, despite the proponents' claim to the contrary.

Recent scholarship has raised concerns about the use of vibrational nudges in digital consumer environments, suggesting that haptic feedback – such as subtle mobile phone vibrations – can increase purchasing behavior without conscious awareness. The study questions whether such subliminal tactics cross ethical boundaries by manipulating impulse control in ways that blur the line between persuasion and coercion.

It has been remarked that nudging is also a euphemism for psychological manipulation as practiced in social engineering.

There exists an anticipation and, simultaneously, implicit criticism of the nudge theory in works of Hungarian social psychologists who emphasize the active participation in the nudge of its target (Ferenc Merei and Laszlo Garai).

== Concepts ==
Behavioral economics aims to improve or overhaul traditional economic theory by studying failures in its assumptions that people are rational and selfish. Specifically, it studies the biases, tendencies and heuristics of people's economic decisions. It aids in determining whether people make good choices and whether they could be helped to make better choices. It can be applied both before and after a decision is made.

=== Search heuristics ===
Behavioral economics proposes search heuristics as an aid for evaluating options. It is motivated by the fact that it is costly to gain information about options and it aims to maximise the utility of searching for information. While each heuristic is not wholistic in its explanation of the search process alone, a combination of these heuristics may be used in the decision-making process. There are three primary search heuristics.

Satisficing

Satisficing is the idea that there is some minimum requirement from the search and once that has been met, stop searching. After satisficing, a person may not have the most optimal option (i.e. the one with the highest utility), but would have a "good enough" one. This heuristic may be problematic if the aspiration level is set at such a level that no products exist that could meet the requirements.

Directed cognition

Directed cognition is a search heuristic in which a person treats each opportunity to research information as their last. Rather than a contingent plan that indicates what will be done based on the results of each search, directed cognition considers only if one more search should be conducted and what alternative should be researched.

Elimination by aspects

Whereas satisficing and directed cognition compare choices, elimination by aspects compares certain qualities. A person using the elimination by aspects heuristic first chooses the quality that they value most in what they are searching for and sets an aspiration level. This may be repeated to refine the search. i.e. identify the second most valued quality and set an aspiration level. Using this heuristic, options will be eliminated as they fail to meet the minimum requirements of the chosen qualities.

=== Heuristics and cognitive effects ===
Besides searching, behavioral economists and psychologists have identified other heuristics and other cognitive effects that affect people's decision making. These include:

Mental accounting

Mental accounting refers to the propensity to allocate resources for specific purposes. Mental accounting is a behavioral bias that causes one to separate money into different categories known as mental accounts either based on the source or the intention of the money.

Anchoring

Anchoring describes when people have a mental reference point with which they compare results to. For example, a person who anticipates that the weather on a particular day would be raining, but finds that on the day it is actually clear blue skies, would gain more utility from the pleasant weather because they anticipated that it would be bad.

Herd behavior

This is a relatively simple bias that reflects the tendency of people to mimic what everyone else is doing and follow the general consensus.

Framing effects

People tend to choose differently depending on how the options are presented to them. People tend to have little control over their susceptibility to the framing effect, as often their choice-making process is based on intuition.

=== Biases and fallacies ===
While heuristics are tactics or mental shortcuts to aid in the decision-making process, people are also affected by a number of biases and fallacies. Behavioral economics identifies a number of these biases that negatively affect decision making such as:

Present bias

Present bias reflects the human tendency to want rewards sooner. It describes people who are more likely to forego a greater payoff in the future in favour of receiving a smaller benefit sooner. An example of this is a smoker who is trying to quit. Although they know that in the future they will suffer health consequences, the immediate gain from the nicotine hit is more favourable to a person affected by present bias. Present bias is commonly split into people who are aware of their present bias (sophisticated) and those who are not (naive).

Gambler's fallacy

The gambler's fallacy stems from law of small numbers. It is the belief that an event that has occurred often in the past is less likely to occur in the future, despite the probability remaining constant. For example, if a coin had been flipped three times and turned up heads every single time, a person influenced by the gambler's fallacy would predict that the next one ought to be tails because of the abnormal number of heads flipped in the past, even though the probability of a heads occurring is still 50%.

Hot hand fallacy

The hot hand fallacy is the opposite of the gambler's fallacy. It is the belief that an event that has occurred often in the past is more likely to occur again in the future such that the streak will continue. This fallacy is particularly common within sports. For example, if a football team has consistently won the last few games they have participated in, then it is often said that they are 'on form' and thus, it is expected that the football team will maintain their winning streak.

Narrative fallacy

Narrative fallacy refers to when people use narratives to connect the dots between random events to make sense of arbitrary information. The term stems from Nassim Taleb's book The Black Swan: The Impact of the Highly Improbable. The narrative fallacy can be problematic as it can lead to individuals making false cause-effect relationships between events. For example, a startup may get funding because investors are swayed by a narrative that sounds plausible, rather than by a more reasoned analysis of available evidence.

Loss aversion

Loss aversion refers to the tendency to place greater weight on losses compared to equivalent gains. In other words, this means that when an individual receives a loss, this will cause their utility to decline more so than the same-sized gain. This means that they are far more likely to try to assign a higher priority on avoiding losses than making investment gains. As a result, some investors might want a higher payout to compensate for losses. If the high payout is not likely, they might try to avoid losses altogether even if the investment's risk is acceptable from a rational standpoint.

Recency bias

Recency bias is the belief that a particular outcome is more probable simply because it had just occurred. For example, if the previous one or two flips were heads, a person affected by recency bias would continue to predict that heads would be flipped.

Confirmation bias

Confirmation bias is the tendency to prefer information consistent with one's beliefs and discount evidence inconsistent with them.

Familiarity bias

Familiarity bias simply describes the tendency of people to return to what they know and are comfortable with. Familiarity bias discourages affected people from exploring new options and may limit their ability to find an optimal solution.

Status quo bias

Status quo bias describes the tendency of people to keep things as they are. It is a particular aversion to change in favor of remaining comfortable with what is known.

Connected to this concept is the endowment effect, a theory that people value things more if they own them – they require more to give up an object than they would be willing to pay to acquire it.

== Behavioral finance ==
Behavioral finance is the study of the influence of psychology on the behavior of investors or financial analysts. It assumes that investors are not always rational, have limits to their self-control and are influenced by their own biases. For example, behavioral law and economics scholars studying the growth of financial firms' technological capabilities have attributed decision science to irrational consumer decisions. It also includes the subsequent effects on the markets. Behavioral Finance attempts to explain the reasoning patterns of investors and measures the influential power of these patterns on the investor's decision making. The central issue in behavioral finance is explaining why market participants make irrational systematic errors contrary to assumption of rational market participants. Such errors affect prices and returns, creating market inefficiencies.

== Applied issues ==
=== Behavioral game theory ===
Behavioral game theory, invented by Colin Camerer, analyzes interactive strategic decisions and behavior using the methods of game theory, experimental economics, and experimental psychology. Experiments include testing deviations from typical simplifications of economic theory such as the independence axiom and neglect of altruism, fairness, and framing effects. On the positive side, the method has been applied to interactive learning and social preferences. As a research program, the subject is a development of the last three decades.

=== Artificial intelligence ===
Much of the decisions are more and more made either by human beings with the assistance of artificial intelligent machines or wholly made by these machines. Tshilidzi Marwala and Evan Hurwitz in their book, studied the utility of behavioral economics in such situations and concluded that these intelligent machines reduce the impact of bounded rational decision making. In particular, they observed that these intelligent machines reduce the degree of information asymmetry in the market, improve decision making and thus making markets more rational.

The use of AI machines in the market in applications such as online trading and decision making has changed major economic theories. Other theories where AI has had impact include in rational choice, rational expectations, game theory, Lewis turning point, portfolio optimization and counterfactual thinking.

=== Other areas of research ===
Other branches of behavioral economics enrich the model of the utility function without implying inconsistency in preferences. Ernst Fehr, Armin Falk, and Rabin studied fairness, inequity aversion and reciprocal altruism, weakening the neoclassical assumption of perfect selfishness. This work is particularly applicable to wage setting. The work on "intrinsic motivation by Uri Gneezy and Aldo Rustichini and "identity" by George Akerlof and Rachel Kranton assumes that agents derive utility from adopting personal and social norms in addition to conditional expected utility. According to Aggarwal, in addition to behavioral deviations from rational equilibrium, markets are also likely to suffer from lagged responses, search costs, externalities of the commons, and other frictions making it difficult to disentangle behavioral effects in market behavior.

"Conditional expected utility" is a form of reasoning where the individual has an illusion of control, and calculates the probabilities of external events and hence their utility as a function of their own action, even when they have no causal ability to affect those external events.

Behavioral economics caught on among the general public with the success of books such as Dan Ariely's Predictably Irrational. Practitioners of the discipline have studied quasi-public policy topics such as broadband mapping. Behavioral economics has also been applied to public health policies, including front-of-pack nutrition labeling, sugar-sweetened beverage taxes, and advertising restrictions for unhealthy foods. These measures use behavioral insights to reshape consumer decisions without eliminating choice.

Applications for behavioral economics include the modeling of the consumer decision-making process for applications in artificial intelligence and machine learning. The Silicon Valley–based start-up Singularities is using the AGM postulates proposed by Alchourrón, Gärdenfors, and Makinson – the formalization of the concepts of beliefs and change for rational entities – in a symbolic logic to create a "machine learning and deduction engine that uses the latest data science and big data algorithms in order to generate the content and conditional rules (counterfactuals) that capture customer's behaviors and beliefs."

The University of Pennsylvania's Center for Health Incentives & Behavioral Economics (CHIBE) looks at how behavioral economics can improve health outcomes. CHIBE researchers have found evidence that many behavioral economics principles (incentives, patient and clinician nudges, gamification, loss aversion, and more) can be helpful to encourage vaccine uptake, smoking cessation, medication adherence, and physical activity, for example.

Applications of behavioral economics also exist in other disciplines, for example in the area of supply chain management.

== Honors and awards ==
=== Nobel Prize ===
==== 1978 – Herbert Simon ====
In 1978 Herbert Simon was awarded the Nobel Memorial Prize in Economic Sciences "for his pioneering research into the decision-making process within economic organizations". Simon earned his Bachelor of Arts and his Ph.D. in political science from the University of Chicago before going on to teach at Carnegie Tech. Herbert was praised for his work on bounded rationality, a challenge to the assumption that humans are rational actors.

==== 2002 – Daniel Kahneman and Vernon L. Smith ====
In 2002, psychologist Daniel Kahneman and economist Vernon L. Smith were awarded the Nobel Memorial Prize in Economic Sciences. Kahneman was awarded the prize "for having integrated insights from psychological research into economic science, especially concerning human judgment and decision-making under uncertainty", while Smith was awarded the prize "for having established laboratory experiments as a tool in empirical economic analysis, especially in the study of alternative market mechanisms."

==== 2017 – Richard Thaler ====
In 2017, economist Richard Thaler was awarded the Nobel Memorial Prize in Economic Sciences for "his contributions to behavioral economics and his pioneering work in establishing that people are predictably irrational in ways that defy economic theory." Thaler was especially recognized for presenting inconsistencies in standard Economic theory and for his formulation of mental accounting and Libertarian paternalism

=== Other awards ===
==== 1999 – Andrei Shleifer ====
The work of Andrei Shleifer focused on behavioral finance and made observations on the limits of the efficient market hypothesis. Shleifer received the 1999 John Bates Clark Medal from the American Economic Association for his work.

==== 2001 – Matthew Rabin ====
Matthew Rabin received the "genius" award from the MarArthur Foundation in 2000. The American Economic Association chose Rabin as the recipient of the 2001 John Bates Clark medal. Rabin's awards were given to him primarily on the basis of his work on fairness and reciprocity, and on present bias.

==== 2003 – Sendhil Mullainathan ====
Sendhil Mullainathan was the youngest of the chosen MacArthur Fellows in 2002, receiving a fellowship grant of $500,000 in 2003. Mullainathan was praised by the MacArthur Foundation as working on economics and psychology as an aggregate. Mullainathan's research focused on the salaries of executives on Wall Street; he also has looked at the implications of racial discrimination in markets in the United States.

== Criticism ==
Taken together, two landmark papers in economic theory which were published before the field of Behavioral Economics emerged, provide a justification for standard neoclassical economic analysis. The first is the paper "Uncertainty, Evolution, and Economic Theory" by Armen Alchian from 1950 and the second is the paper "Irrational Behavior and Economic Theory" from 1962 by Gary Becker, both of which were published in the Journal of Political Economy. Alchian's 1950 paper uses the logic of natural selection, the Evolutionary Landscape model, stochastic processes, probability theory, and several other lines of reasoning to justify many of the results derived from standard supply analysis assuming firms which maximizing their profits, are certain about the future, and have accurate foresight without having to assume any of those things. Becker's 1962 paper shows that downward sloping market demand curves (the most important implication of the law of demand) do not actually require an assumption that the consumers in that market are rational, as is claimed by behavioral economists and they also follow from a wide variety of irrational behavior as well.

The lines of reasoning and argumentation used in these two papers is re-expressed and expanded upon in (at least) one other professional economic publication for each of them. As for Alchian's evolutionary economics via natural selection by way of environmental adoption thesis, it is summarized, followed by an explicit exploration of its theoretical implications for Behavioral Economic theory, then illustrated via examples in several different industries including banking, hospitality, and transportation, in the 2014 paper "Uncertainty, Evolution, and Behavioral Economic Theory," by Manne and Zywicki. And the argument made in Becker's 1962 paper, that a 'pure' increase in the (relative) price (or terms of trade) of good X must reduce the amount of X demanded in the market for good X, is explained in greater detail in chapters (or as he calls them, "Lectures" because this textbook is more or less a transcription of his lectures given in his Price Theory course taught to 1st year PhD students several years earlier) 4 (called The Opportunity Set) and 5 (called Substitution Effects) of Gary Becker's graduate level textbook Economic Theory, originally published in 1971.

Besides the three critical aforementioned articles, critics of behavioral economics typically stress the rationality of economic agents. A fundamental critique is provided by Maialeh (2019) who argues that no behavioral research can establish an economic theory. Examples provided on this account include pillars of behavioral economics such as satisficing behavior or prospect theory, which are confronted from the neoclassical perspective of utility maximization and expected utility theory respectively. The author shows that behavioral findings are hardly generalizable and that they do not disprove typical mainstream axioms related to rational behavior.

Others, such as the essayist and former trader Nassim Taleb note that cognitive theories, such as prospect theory, are models of decision-making, not generalized economic behavior, and are only applicable to the sort of once-off decision problems presented to experiment participants or survey respondents. It is noteworthy that in the episode of EconTalk in which Taleb said this, he and the host, Russ Roberts discuss the significance of Gary Becker's 1962 paper cited in the first paragraph in this section as an argument against any implications which can be drawn from one shot psychological experiments on market level outcomes outside of laboratory settings, i.e. in the real world. Others argue that decision-making models, such as the endowment effect theory, that have been widely accepted by behavioral economists may be erroneously established as a consequence of poor experimental design practices that do not adequately control subject misconceptions.

Despite a great deal of rhetoric, no unified behavioral theory has yet been espoused: behavioral economists have proposed no alternative unified theory of their own to replace neoclassical economics with.

David Gal has argued that many of these issues stem from behavioral economics being too concerned with understanding how behavior deviates from standard economic models rather than with understanding why people behave the way they do. Understanding why behavior occurs is necessary for the creation of generalizable knowledge, the goal of science. He has referred to behavioral economics as a "triumph of marketing" and particularly cited the example of loss aversion. David Gal also has argued that loss aversion may not be as robust or universal as often claimed. He suggests that alternative explanations, such as psychological inertia, better explain certain behaviors like the endowment effect and status quo bias.

Traditional economists are skeptical of the experimental and survey-based techniques that behavioral economics uses extensively. Economists typically stress revealed preferences over stated preferences (from surveys) in the determination of economic value. Experiments and surveys are at risk of systemic biases, strategic behavior and lack of incentive compatibility. Some researchers point out that participants of experiments conducted by behavioral economists are not representative enough and drawing broad conclusions on the basis of such experiments is not possible. An acronym WEIRD has been coined in order to describe the studies participants – as those who come from Western, Educated, Industrialized, Rich, and Democratic societies. Critics have also highlighted that much of behavioral economics research relies on WEIRD populations, raising questions about the generalizability of findings to other cultures and socioeconomic groups.

=== Responses ===
Matthew Rabin dismisses these criticisms, countering that consistent results typically are obtained in multiple situations and geographies and can produce good theoretical insight. Behavioral economists, however, responded to these criticisms by focusing on field studies rather than lab experiments. Some economists see a fundamental schism between experimental economics and behavioral economics, but prominent behavioral and experimental economists tend to share techniques and approaches in answering common questions. For example, behavioral economists are investigating neuroeconomics, which is entirely experimental and has not been verified in the field.

The epistemological, ontological, and methodological components of behavioral economics are increasingly debated, in particular by historians of economics and economic methodologists.

According to some researchers, when studying the mechanisms that form the basis of decision-making, especially financial decision-making, it is necessary to recognize that most decisions are made under stress because, "Stress is the nonspecific body response to any demands presented to it."

=== Limitations ===
A widely noted concern is the replicability crisis; many behavioral economics studies fail to reproduce when repeated. A 2024 WSJ review reports that fewer than half of nudging-based experiments sustain long-term impact when re-tested, bringing into question their external validity in complex, real-world conditions. Supporting this, behavioral economics scholars have acknowledged that "small effect sizes and limited sample diversity" often hinder the generalizability of results.

== Related fields ==
=== Experimental economics ===
Experimental economics is the application of experimental methods, including statistical, econometric, and computational, to study economic questions. Data collected in experiments are used to estimate effect size, test the validity of economic theories, and illuminate market mechanisms. Economic experiments usually use cash to motivate subjects, in order to mimic real-world incentives. Experiments are used to help understand how and why markets and other exchange systems function as they do. Experimental economics have also expanded to understand institutions and the law (experimental law and economics).

A fundamental aspect of the subject is design of experiments. Experiments may be conducted in the field or in laboratory settings, whether of individual or group behavior.

Variants of the subject outside such formal confines include natural and quasi-natural experiments.

=== Neuroeconomics ===
Neuroeconomics is an interdisciplinary field that seeks to explain human decision making, the ability to process multiple alternatives and to follow a course of action. It studies how economic behavior can shape our understanding of the brain, and how neuroscientific discoveries can constrain and guide models of economics. It combines research methods from neuroscience, experimental and behavioral economics, and cognitive and social psychology. As research into decision-making behavior becomes increasingly computational, it has also incorporated new approaches from theoretical biology, computer science, and mathematics.

Neuroeconomics studies decision making by using a combination of tools from these fields so as to avoid the shortcomings that arise from a single-perspective approach. In mainstream economics, expected utility (EU) and the concept of rational agents are still being used. Many economic behaviors are not fully explained by these models, such as heuristics and framing. Behavioral economics emerged to account for these anomalies by integrating social, cognitive, and emotional factors in understanding economic decisions. Neuroeconomics adds another layer by using neuroscientific methods in understanding the interplay between economic behavior and neural mechanisms. By using tools from various fields, some scholars claim that neuroeconomics offers a more integrative way of understanding decision making.

=== Evolutionary psychology ===
An evolutionary psychology perspective states that many of the perceived limitations in rational choice can be explained as being rational in the context of maximizing biological fitness in the ancestral environment, but not necessarily in the current one. Thus, when living at subsistence level where a reduction of resources may result in death, it may have been rational to place a greater value on preventing losses than on obtaining gains. It may also explain behavioral differences between groups, such as males being less risk-averse than females since males have more variable reproductive success than females. While unsuccessful risk-seeking may limit reproductive success for both sexes, males may potentially increase their reproductive success from successful risk-seeking much more than females can.

== Related texts ==
- A Little History of Economics written by Niall Kishtainy – multi-topic book, touches on behavioral economics and gives real life examples that are easier to understand even without much previous economic knowledge.
- Misbehaving written by Richard H. Thaler – focuses on the development of the field and the struggle to get behavioral economics as a recognized by traditional economics
- The Behavioral Economics Guide 2023 (multiple authors) – expert, peer-reviewed articles that focus on applying behavioral science relating to employee/client outcomes, reducing decision-making bias, strategic foresight, and nudging for health.
- Thinking Fast and Slow written by Daniel Kahneman – explores the two systems that drive the way we think, intuitive thinking and logical thinking.
- Predictably Irrational written by Dan Ariely – looks at how humans consistently make irrational decisions in systematic ways.
- Nudge written by Richard H. Thaler – looks at how subtle environmental conditions can improve peoples decision making.

== Notable people ==
=== Economics ===
- George Akerlof
- Werner De Bondt
- Paul De Grauwe
- Linda C. Babcock
- Douglas Bernheim
- Colin Camerer
- Armin Falk
- Urs Fischbacher
- Tshilidzi Marwala
- Susan E. Mayer
- Ernst Fehr
- Simon Gächter
- Uri Gneezy
- David Laibson
- Louis Lévy-Garboua
- John A. List
- George Loewenstein
- Fadi Makki
- Sendhil Mullainathan
- John Quiggin
- Matthew Rabin
- Reinhard Selten
- Herbert A. Simon
- Vernon L. Smith
- Robert Sugden
- Larry Summers
- Richard Thaler
- Abhijit Banerjee
- Esther Duflo
- Kevin Volpp
- Katy Milkman

=== Finance ===
- Malcolm Baker
- Nicholas Barberis
- Gunduz Caginalp
- David Hirshleifer
- Andrew Lo
- Michael Mauboussin
- Terrance Odean
- Richard L. Peterson
- Charles Plott
- Robert Prechter
- Hersh Shefrin
- Robert Shiller
- Andrei Shleifer
- Robert Vishny

=== Psychology ===
- George Ainslie
- Dan Ariely
- Ed Diener
- Ward Edwards
- Laszlo Garai
- Gerd Gigerenzer
- Daniel Kahneman
- Ariel Kalil
- George Katona
- Walter Mischel
- Drazen Prelec
- Eldar Shafir
- Paul Slovic
- John Staddon
- Amos Tversky
- Moran Cerf

== See also ==
- Adaptive market hypothesis
- Animal Spirits (Keynes)
- Behavioralism
- Behavioral operations research
- Behavioral Strategy
- Big Five personality traits
- Confirmation bias
- Cultural economics
- Culture change
- Economic sociology
- Emotional bias
- Fuzzy-trace theory
- Hindsight bias
- Homo reciprocans
- Important publications in behavioral economics
- List of cognitive biases
- Methodological individualism
- Nudge theory
- Observational techniques
- Praxeology
- Priority heuristic
- Regret theory
- Repugnancy costs
- Socioeconomics
- Socionomics
- Ainslie, G. (1975). "Specious Reward: A Behavioral /Theory of Impulsiveness and Impulse Control". Psychological Bulletin. 82 (4): 463–96. Bibcode:1975PsycB..82..463A. doi:10.1037/h0076860. PMID 1099599. S2CID 10279574.
- Baddeley, M. (2017). Behavioural economics: a very short introduction (Vol. 505). Oxford University Press.
- Barberis, N.; Shleifer, A.; Vishny, R. (1998). "A Model of Investor Sentiment". Journal of Financial Economics. 49 (3): 307–43. doi:10.1016/S0304-405X(98)00027-0. S2CID 154782800. Archived from the original on April 20, 2008.
- Becker, Gary S. (1968). "Crime and Punishment: An Economic Approach" (PDF). The Journal of Political Economy. 76 (2): 169–217. doi:10.1086/259394.
- Benartzi, Shlomo; Thaler, Richard H. (1995). "Myopic Loss Aversion and the Equity Premium Puzzle" (PDF). The Quarterly Journal of Economics. 110 (1): 73–92. Bibcode:1995QJEco.110...73B. doi:10.2307/2118511. JSTOR 2118511. S2CID 55030273.
- Cunningham, Lawrence A. (2002). "Behavioral Finance and Investor Governance". Washington & Lee Law Review. 59: 767. doi:10.2139/ssrn.255778. ISSN 1942-6658. S2CID 152538297.
- Daniel, K.; Hirshleifer, D.; Subrahmanyam, A. (1998). "Investor Psychology and Security Market Under- and Overreactions" (PDF). Journal of Finance. 53 (6): 1839–85. Bibcode:1998JFin...53.1839D. doi:10.1111/0022-1082.00077. hdl:2027.42/73431. S2CID 32589687.
- Diamond, Peter; Vartiainen, Hannu (2012). Behavioral Economics and Its Applications. Princeton University Press. ISBN 978-1-4008-2914-9.
- Eatwell, John; Milgate, Murray; Newman, Peter, eds. (1988). The New Palgrave: A Dictionary of Economics. Macmillan. ISBN 978-0-935859-10-2.
- Garai, Laszlo (2016). "Identity Economics: "An Alternative Economic Psychology"". Reconsidering Identity Economics. New York, NY: Palgrave Macmillan US. pp. 35–40. doi:10.1057/978-1-137-52561-1_3. ISBN 9781137525604.
- Genesove, David; Mayer, Christopher (March 2001). "Loss Aversion and Seller Behavior: Evidence from the Housing Market" (PDF). Quarterly Journal of Economics. 116 (4): 1233–1260. Bibcode:2001QJEco.116.1233G. doi:10.1162/003355301753265561. S2CID 154641267.
- Hens, Thorsten; Bachmann, Kremena (2008). Behavioural Finance for Private Banking. Wiley Finance Series. ISBN 978-0-470-77999-6.
- Hogarth, R. M.; Reder, M. W. (1987). Rational Choice: The Contrast between Economics and Psychology. Chicago, IL: University of Chicago Press. ISBN 978-0-226-34857-5.
- John, K. (2015). "Behavioral indifference curves". Australasian Journal of Economics Education. 12 (2): 1–11.
- Kahneman, Daniel; Tversky, Amos (1979). "Prospect Theory: An Analysis of Decision under Risk". Econometrica. 47 (2): 263–91. doi:10.2307/1914185. JSTOR 1914185.
- Kahneman, Daniel; Diener, Ed (2003). Well-being: the foundations of hedonic psychology. Russell Sage Foundation.
- Kirkpatrick, Charles D.; Dahlquist, Julie R. (2007). Technical Analysis: The Complete Resource for Financial Market Technicians. Upper Saddle River, NJ: Financial Times Press. ISBN 978-0-13-153113-0.
- Kuran, Timur (1997). Private Truths, Public Lies: The Social Consequences of Preference Falsification. Harvard University Press. p. 7. ISBN 978-0-674-70758-0.
- Luce, R Duncan (2000). Utility of Gains and Losses: Measurement-theoretical and Experimental Approaches. Mahwah, New Jersey: Lawrence Erlbaum Publishers. ISBN 978-0-8058-3460-4.
- McGaughey, E. (2014), "Behavioural Economics and Labour Law", LSE Legal Studies Working Paper, no. 20/2014, SSRN 2460685
- Metcalfe, R; Dolan, P (2012). "Behavioural economics and its implications for transport". Journal of Transport Geography. 24: 503–11. Bibcode:2012JTGeo..24..503M. doi:10.1016/j.jtrangeo.2012.01.019.
- Mullainathan, S.; Thaler, R. H. (2001). "Behavioral Economics". International Encyclopedia of the Social & Behavioral Sciences. pp. 1094–1100. doi:10.1016/B0-08-043076-7/02247-6. ISBN 9780080430768.
- Plott, Charles R.; Smith, Vernon L. (2008). Handbook of Experimental Economics Results. Vol. 1. Elsevier.
- Rabin, Matthew (1998). "Psychology and Economics" (PDF). Journal of Economic Literature. 36 (1): 11–46. Archived from the original (PDF) on September 27, 2011.
- Schelling, Thomas C. (2006). Micromotives and Macrobehavior. W. W. Norton. ISBN 978-0-393-06977-8.
- Sent, E.M. (2004). "Behavioral economics: How psychology made its (limited) way back into economics". History of Political Economy. 36 (4): 735–60. doi:10.1215/00182702-36-4-735. hdl:2066/67175. S2CID 143911190.
- Shefrin, Hersh (2002). "Behavioral decision making, forecasting, game theory, and role-play" (PDF). International Journal of Forecasting. 18 (3): 375–82. doi:10.1016/S0169-2070(02)00021-3.
- Shleifer, Andrei (1999). Inefficient Markets: An Introduction to Behavioral Finance. New York: Oxford University Press. ISBN 978-0-19-829228-9.
- Simon, Herbert A. (1987). "Behavioral Economics". The New Palgrave: A Dictionary of Economics. Vol. 1. pp. 221–24.
- Thaler, Richard H (2016). "Behavioral Economics: Past, Present, and Future". American Economic Review. 106 (7): 1577–1600. doi:10.1257/aer.106.7.1577.
- Thaler, Richard H.; Mullainathan, Sendhil (2008). "Behavioral Economics". In David R. Henderson (ed.). Concise Encyclopedia of Economics (2nd ed.). Indianapolis: Library of Economics and Liberty. ISBN 978-0-86597-665-8. OCLC 237794267.
- Wheeler, Gregory (2018). "Bounded Rationality". In Edward Zalta (ed.). Stanford Encyclopedia of Philosophy. Stanford, CA: Stanford University.
