= Louis Lévy-Garboua =

French economist (born 1945)

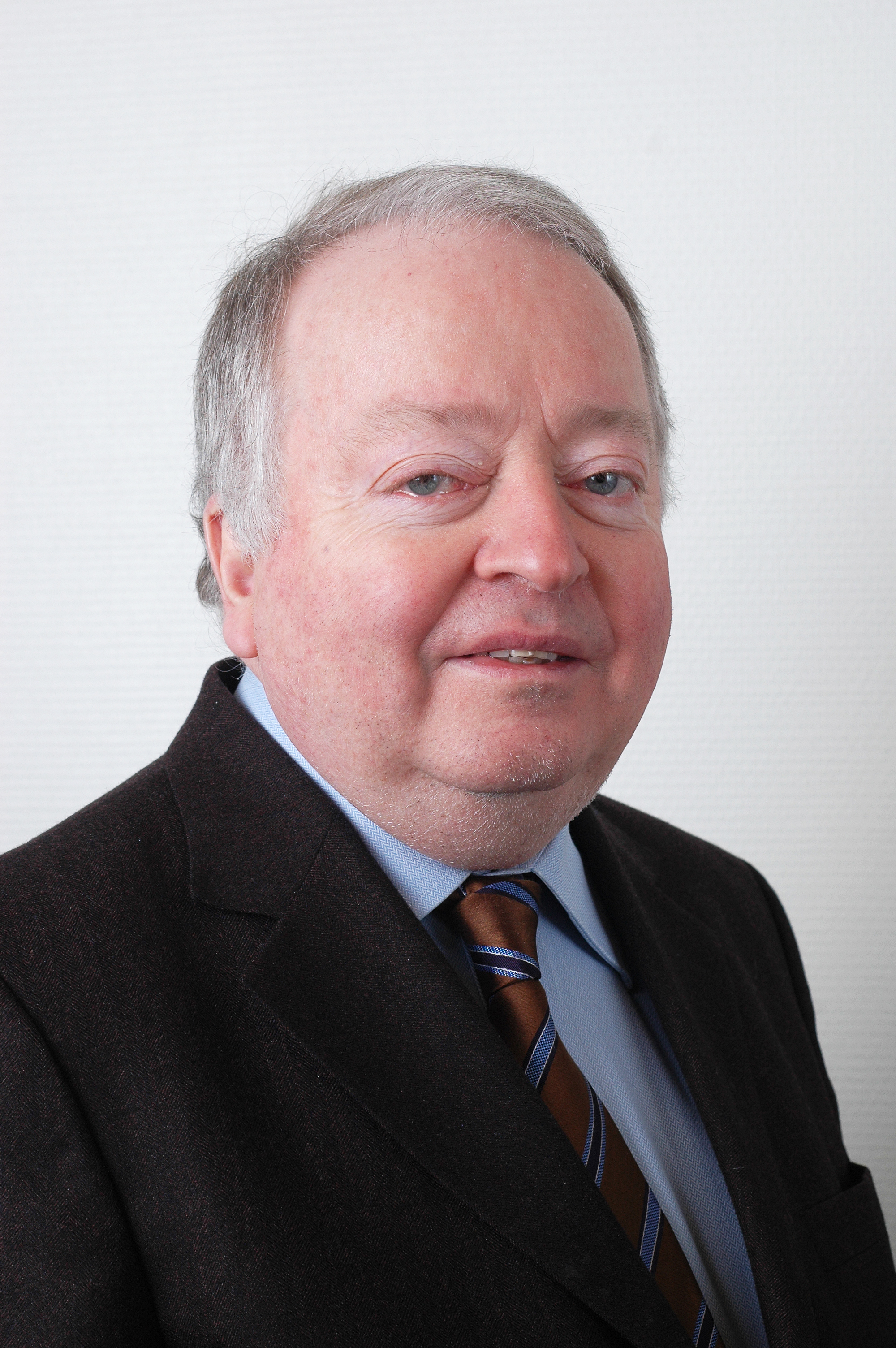
- Born: 27 September 1945 (age 81); Cairo, Egypt

Academic background
- Education: University of Paris 1 Pantheon-Sorbonne (PhD); École Polytechnique

Academic work
- Discipline: Behavioral economics, Microeconomics
- Institutions: Paris School of Economics; University of Paris 1 Pantheon-Sorbonne; Centre national de la recherche scientifique
- Awards: Ordre national du Mérite (1995); Prix de l'Association Française de science Économique (1973)
- Website: Information at IDEAS / RePEc

Louis Lévy-Garboua (born 27 September 1945) is a French economist whose work focuses on behavioral economics and microeconomics. He is a distinguished professor at the University of Paris 1 Pantheon-Sorbonne and at the Paris School of Economics.

== Academic career ==
From 1969 to 1988, Lévy-Garboua worked as a researcher at the Centre de Recherche pour l'Étude et l'Observation des Conditions de Vie (CREDOC). In 1977, he created and directed the research team "Économie Sociologique" under the Centre National de la Recherche Scientifique (CNRS). He has been a visiting professor at international institutions, including the University of Montreal, where he has been a research fellow at CIRANO (since 2000).

Lévy-Garboua was established the Laboratoire de Microéconomie Appliquée (LAMIA) in 1986 and served as the first director of the Doctoral School of Applied Economic Analysis in 1991 for his university. He has also played an active role in academic organizations, such as the European Public Choice Society, Journées de Microéconomie Appliquée (JMA), and the Society for the Advancement of Behavioral Economics (SABE).

His main collective accomplishments have been to contribute to:

- The diffusion of applied microeconomics in French universities through consistent curricula, an annual successful conference, and a research team (Journées de Microéconomie Appliquée since 1984; Laboratoire de Microéconomie Appliquée).
- The creation of a new Master in Economics and Psychology jointly delivered by Paris 1 Panthéon-Sorbonne and Paris Descartes University (since 2010).
- On a personal level, he developed an interest and expertise in interdisciplinary research, connecting economic theory with sociology (in his early career) and psychology.

== Research ==
Lévy-Garboua's research primarily focuses on behavioral economics, economics and psychology, decision theory, education and labor economics, and cultural economics. He has explored topics such as risk perception, cognitive biases in economic decision-making, job and school satisfaction, and the role of aspirations in human capital formation. His work has been widely cited in studies on education, cultural consumption, taxation, and social norms.

== Selected publications ==
- 1972, "Le comportement bancaire, le diviseur de crédit et l'efficacité du contrôle monétaire" (with Vivien Lévy-Garboua), Revue Economique 23, 243-282.
- Recherche sur les rendements de l'éducation en France, Paris, Édition CNRS, Col. A.T.P., n° 1, 1973.
- 1976, "Les demandes de l'étudiant ou les contradictions de l'Université de Masse", Revue Française de Sociologie 17, 53-80.
- L'aide aux étudiants en France : faits et critique, Paris, Édition Economica, (with B. Lemennicier, B. Millot, F. Orivel), Édition CNRS, Col. A.T.P., n° 18, 1977.
- 1979, Economique de l'Education : travaux français, Paris: Economica, (with J.C. Eicher et alii,), 378p.
- Sociological Economics, Londres, Édition Sage Pub, 1979.
- A Microeconometric Study of Theatre Demand, with Claude Montmarquette, Journal of Cultural Economics 20 (1996), 25–50.
- Cognition in Seemingly Riskless Choices and Judgments, with Claude Montmarquette, (1996), published in Rationality and Society 8 (1996), 167-185.
- On the Rationality of Cognitive Dissonance, with Serge Blondel in The Expansion of Economics : Towards an Inclusive Social Science, S. Grossbard-Schechtman et C. Clague (eds), MESharpe, Inc., (2002), 227-238.
- Perception Séquentielle et Rationalité Limitée, (2003), published in Journal des Economistes et des Etudes Humaines 14 (2004), 63-77.
- An Economist's View of Schooling Systems, with Nathalie Damoiselet, Gérard Lassibille and Lucia Navarro-Gomez in Human Capital over the Life Cycle, C. Sofer (ed.), Cheltenham, UK: Edward Elgar, (2004), 53-68.
- Reported Job Satisfaction : What Does it Mean?, with Claude Montmarquette, Journal of Socio-Economics 33 (2004), 135-151.
- 2005 : Fiscalité et offre de travail : une étude expérimentale (with D. Masclet and C. Montmarquette), Économie et Prévision.
- Preference Formation, School Dissatisfaction and Risky Behavior of Adolescents, with Youenn Lohéac and Bertrand Fayolle, Journal of Economic Psychology 27 (2006), 165-183.
- The Formation of Social Preferences : Some Lessons from Psychology and Biology, with Claude Meidinger and Benoît Rapoport, in Handbook on the Economics of Giving, Altruism and Reciprocity, S.C. Kolm, and J. Mercier-Ythier (Eds.), Amsterdam : Elsevier (2006), 545-613.
- 2006 : Aspiration Levels and Educational Choices : an Experimental Study (with L. Page and C. Montmarquette), Volume 26, Issue 6, Décembre 2007, Pages 747-757.
- 2006 : Responsabilité individuelle et fiscalité (with C. Montmarquette and M.C. Villeval), Économie et Prévision, 2006
- Job Satisfaction and Quits, with Claude Montmarquette and Véronique Simonnet, Labour Economics 14 (2007), 251-268.
- Learning from Experience or Learning from Others ? Inferring Informal Training from a Human Capital Earnings Function with Matched Employer-Employee Data, with Guillaume Destré and Michel Sollogoub, Journal of Socio-Economics 37, (2008), 919-938.
- A Behavioral Laffer Curve : Emergence of a Social Norm of Fairness in a Real Effort Experiment, with David Masclet and Claude Montmarquette, Journal of Economic Psychology, 30, (2009), 47-161.
- "Risk Aversion and Framing Effects" (with H. Maafi, D. Masclet, et A. Terracol), Experimental Economics 15, (2012), 128-144.
- "Voluntary Contributions to a Mutual Insurance Pool" (with C. Montmarquette, J. Vaksmann, M.C. Villeval), Journal of Public Economic Theory 19, (2017), 198-218.
- "Confidence Biases and Learning among Intuitive Bayesians" (with M. Askari and M. Gazel), Theory and Decision 84, (2018), 453-482.
- "Creative Cognition as a Bandit Problem" (with M. Gazel, N. Berlin, J. Dul, and T. Lubart), Learning and Individual Differences 111, (2024), 102348.

== Awards ==
- Prix de l'Association Française de science Économique décerné à la thèse de Louis Lévy-Garboua, 1973
- Chevalier de l'Ordre national du Mérite, 1995
