= Disposition effect =

Cognitive bias

The disposition effect is the tendency, or disposition, of investors to sell their winning positions too early and to hold their losing positions too long. It is one of the first, and most studied investor behavior patterns documented in the modern behavioral finance literature.

== Shefrin and Statman's 1985 study ==
In a 1985 paper, Hersh Shefrin and Meir Statman coined the term disposition effect and analyzed the psychology underlying its associated behavior. The starting point for Shefrin and Statman's analysis is a 1978 article by Gary Schlarbaum, Wilbur Lewellen and Ronald Lease. Schlarbaum et al. noted the possibility that individual investors might exhibit "a disposition to sell the winners and ride the losers," and wondered whether "what we observe is a psychological rather than an economic phenomenon." They concluded that their data did not support the tendency for investors to sell their winners and ride their losers.

Shefrin and Statman drew on the psychology literature to identify the characteristics of the disposition effect as a "psychological phenomenon." In doing so, they examined the evidence on disposition effect behavior that was available at the time, suggesting that the evidence did support the existence of the effect.

Shefrin and Statman proposed that the psychological components that underlie the disposition effect consist of four elements:

• loss aversion and aversion to accepting a sure loss as expressed by the value function and associated reference point in prospect theory

• mental accounting relating to internal tracking of securities performance, relative to original purchase price

• regret avoidance, relating to emotions of pride, regret, and responsibility for decision outcomes; and

• self-control, relating to internal conflicts between thoughts and feelings about when to sell a position, and techniques (nudges) for managing such conflicts

Shefrin and Statman argued that the psychology underlying the disposition effect combines all four elements, and that none of these alone would generate the full disposition effect. In particular, prospect theory does not explain the full disposition effect.

Shefrin and Statman discussed the disposition effect in the context of tax-loss selling (in December). They pointed out that from a neoclassical perspective, disposition effect behavior can be suboptimal, or boundedly rational, relative to an optimal tax loss selling strategy. They emphasized that in December, as they focused on tax-loss selling, investors might reframe the decision problems they perceived themselves as facing. Consequently, disposition effect behavior might well be mitigated or reversed in December. Hence, having a predisposition to sell winners too early and hold losers too long does not imply that investors will behave in accordance with the disposition effect.

The disposition effect is rooted in investors' preferences, but need not be rooted in their beliefs. The combination of preferences and beliefs drives behavior, not preferences alone. This is why investors who are predisposed to exhibit the disposition effect might sell their losers when they panic. In this respect, consider that in prospect theory, any well-defined risky prospect in the domain of losses will have a certainty equivalent (that is itself, a loss). This means that accepting a certain loss that is less in absolute value than the certainty equivalent is preferable to facing the risky prospect. Accepting the risky loss is at odds with disposition effect behavior.

Disposition effect behavior can generate positive emotions such as pride and negative emotions such as regret. These emotions can be regarded as components of realized utility, lying outside the neoclassical perspective that attaches utility only to monetary outcomes. Notably, regret is often compounded by having taken responsibility for the decision, and having to admit (to oneself) having made a mistake. A key aspect of this issue is that the pain of regret, or pleasure from pride, are generated when a mental account is closed. Closing an account alters the status of a gain or loss from being a paper gain or loss to being a realized gain or loss respectively.

Some investors might be unhappy that they exhibit disposition effect behavior, but find it difficult to change that behavior. Such a situation gives rise to a self-control conflict. Shefrin and Statman discuss techniques to address self-control challenges. Some are nudges, that might arise from third parties such as financial advisors. An example would be the use of framing language such as "transfer your assets." The transferring of assets from one mental account to another is a mental operation; and it might avoid the alternative mental operation of closing an account and experiencing the associated pain of regret.

Another technique is a self-nudge, which consists of using stop-loss orders. Both of these techniques are designed to address what in his book The Art of Selling Intangibles, author Leroy Gross calls "getevenitis," the desire to break even in order to avoid an outcome in the domain of losses. Notably, Shefrin and Statman hypothesized that because of competition, professional investors would be better able to use self-nudges than individual investors.

== Odean's 1998 study ==
Using data from 10,000 customer accounts at a nationwide discount brokerage house, Terrance Odean (1998) tested the main predictions associated with the disposition effect. The period of his study was January 1987 through December 1993. While previous studies used length of round trips in trades to measure disposition effect behavior, Odean developed a different methodology. He proceeded by classifying, for each investor and trading day, winning stocks (relative to purchase price) and losing stocks. As a base reference amount, he computed the value of all the stock positions that were classified as capital gains and called the fraction of all gains sold on that day the proportion of gains realized (PGR). Analogously, he defined for losses the proportion of losses realized (PLR). Odean operationalized the disposition effect through the inequality PGR > PLR in all months but December, with the difference PGR – PLR being lowest in December.

Odean found that for most of the year, on average a stock that was up in value was almost 60% more likely to be sold than a stock that was down in value. Outside of December, PGR was about 14.8%, while PLR was 9.8%. However, the pattern reversed in December, when losses were realized at a more rapid rate than gains: PGR fell to 10.8% while PLR rose to 12.8%.

== Other studies ==
Weber and Camerer (1998) conducted an experiment to assess whether subjects would exhibit the disposition effect. Their subjects bought and sold shares in six risky assets, whose prices fluctuated in each period. They report that "subjects did tend to sell winners and keep losers. When the shares were automatically sold after each period, the disposition effect was greatly reduced." Notably, Weber and Camerer focus only on prospect theory as a determinant of disposition effect behavior.

Using Finnish data, Grinblatt and Keloharju (2001) find that in December investors are 36% more likely to sell extreme losers than they are during the rest of the year. However, most investors delay selling extreme losers until the last eight trading days of the year. The effect for moderate losses is very small. Analysis of Finnish data by Seru, Shumway, and Stoffman (2010) finds that the cost of the disposition effect, in terms of returns, lies between 3.2% and 5.7% for the average investor.

Feng and Seasholes (2005) find that investors in China exhibit the disposition effect. These authors report that investor holding more stocks, who are plausibly more sophisticated than investors who hold fewer stocks, are less prone to exhibiting the disposition effect. Specifically, a sophisticated investor is 67% less prone to the disposition effect than the average investor.

Investors in Taiwan also exhibit the disposition effect. Barber, Lee, Liu, and Odean (2006) report that Taiwanese investors are approximately twice as likely to sell winners relative to losers. In addition, 85% of the investors in their sample sell winners at a faster rate than losers. This study focuses on both individual investors and investment professionals. Barber et al. find that individual investors, corporations, and dealers, who dominate the market, are reluctant to realize losses. In contrast, mutual funds and foreigners are not reluctant to realize losses.

The disposition effect is a preference-driven predisposition to a particular behavior pattern. As discussed above, disposition effect behavior is impacted by both preferences and beliefs. Ben-David and Hirshleifer (2012) examine how investor preferences and beliefs affect trading in relation to past gains and losses. They note that the probability of selling as a function of profit is V-shaped; at short holding periods, investors are more likely to sell big losers than small ones. Ben-David and Hirshleifer report that there is little evidence of an upward jump in selling at zero profits. Hence, they suggest that their findings provide no clear indication that realization preference explains trading. They add that, in their view, the disposition effect is not driven by a simple direct preference for selling a stock by virtue of having a gain versus loss. Instead, trading based on belief revisions can potentially explain these findings.

Contrary to Shefrin and Statman's conjecture, the disposition effect impacts investment professionals as well as individual investors. Frazzini (2006) studies the disposition effect associated with mutual fund managers. He finds that on balance mutual fund managers exhibit the disposition effect, though to a lesser degree than individual investors. At the same time, underperforming (loser) funds are 1.7 times more likely to realize a paper gain than a paper loss. That is, underperforming managers appear to be as prone to the disposition effect as individual investors.

Coval and Shumway (2005) study the disposition effect using Treasury bond futures, traded on the Chicago Board of Trade. These authors find that traders associated with more than $200 million in contracts per day are more likely to take additional risk in the afternoon after experiencing morning losses as opposed to morning gains. The probability of taking above-average afternoon risk is 31% after morning losses, but only a 27% probability after morning gains. Coval and Shumway's note that their main finding is that the disposition effect is the strongest behavioral bias they identify and that the most applicable reference point is original purchase price.

Methodologically, both Coval and Shumway (2005) and Feng and Seasholes (2005) use survival analysis to analyze how long a stock is likely to survive in an investor's portfolio before being sold. Feng and Seasholes (2005) discuss the advantages of using survival analysis over the PGR/PLR approach for studying behavior at the level of the individual.

There is evidence about how the disposition effect separates outperforming investors from underperforming investors. Wermers (2003) analyzes how the disposition effect is related to the relative performance of mutual funds. Akepanidtaworn, Di Mascio, Imas, and Schmidt (2023) conclude that while there is clear evidence of skill in buying, selling decisions underperform substantially—even relative to random selling strategies. Locke and Mann (2005) analyze how the disposition effect is related to the relative performance of futures traders.

Wermers notes that members of both outperforming mutual funds and underperforming funds fail to sell stocks associated with negative momentum, meaning neither cuts losses quickly. A key distinguishing factor between the two groups is cash flow coupled with momentum investing. Underperforming funds ride recent losers, and are reluctant to replace them with recent winners. In contrast, outperforming funds hold recent winners and capitalize on momentum with their new cash inflows. Top quintile funds experience cash inflows of 20.3% a year, while bottom quintile funds experience cash outflows of 1.9% percent a year.

Akepanidtaworn et al. (2023) explain that despite the similarity between buying and selling decisions in frequency, substance and consequences matter for performance. They report evidence suggestiong that an asymmetric allocation of cognitive resources such as attention can explain the discrepancy. In particular, they document a systematic, costly heuristic process when selling but not when buying.

Locke and Mann (2005) analyze how the disposition effect is related to the relative performance of futures traders. Locke and Mann focus on the division of a year into its first and second halves. They use the first half of the year to characterize traders by their susceptibility to the disposition effect. They then correlate the degree of susceptibility to trading success in the second half of the year. They find that disposition-prone traders tend to take on much more risk to achieve trading profits. In the majority of cases, being disposition- prone is negatively correlated with future income. RAP is the ratio of daily trading income to value at risk (VaR). Locke and Mann report that their results for RAP are stronger than for income.

== Relationship between disposition effect and momentum ==
Grinblatt and Han (2004) explain how the disposition effect can generate momentum in stock price returns. Because the disposition effect stipulates that investors sell their winners early but ride their losers, the effect will slow the speed with which prices revert to fundamental value. If investors rush to sell stocks on good news, then the selling pressure will dampen the upward adjustment of price to fundamental value. If investors are reluctant to sell stocks on bad news, then the absence of selling pressure likewise will dampen the downward adjustment of price to fundamental value. The result will be short-term momentum.

Grinblatt and Han constructed a measure for the capital gains overhang of a stock. The capital gains overhang measures the magnitude of paper gains (unrealized capital gains), where a negative gain signifies a loss. Stocks associated with a large positive overhang carry the potential for investors to act in accordance with the disposition effect. Grinblatt and Han concluded that for U.S. stocks the capital gains overhang explains short-term momentum completely, at least in a statistical sense. In addition, their disposition-effect based framework provides additional insight about the reversal of momentum at the turn-of-the-year.

Frazzini (2006) suggests a trading strategy in which investors go long in good-news stocks with the largest fund overhang values, suggesting that these would feature the largest expected future return drift. Analogously, Frazzini recommends shorting bad-news stocks with the most negative fund overhang values, meaning paper losses. He defines news events as earnings surprises, which he measures using market model cumulative abnormal returns around earnings announcements. Frazzini reported that his long/short trading strategy would have generated a spread of 2.4 percent a month.

== Additional literature ==
Nicholas Barberis and Wei Xiong have depicted the disposition impact as the trade of individual investors are one of the most important realities. The influence, they note, has been recorded in all the broad individual investor trading activity databases available and has been linked to significant pricing phenomena such as post-earnings announcement drift and momentum at the stock level. In other conditions, for example in the real estate market, disposition effects were also discovered.

Barberis has noted that the disposition effect is not a rational sort of conduct because of the reality of stock market momentum, meaning stocks that have performed well in the past six months appear to perform well in the next six months, and stocks that have done badly in the past six months tend to do poorly in the next six months. This being the case, the rational act would be to hold on to stocks which have recently increased in value; and to sell stocks which have recently decreased in value. However, individual investors tend to do just the contrary.

Alexander Joshi has summed up the disposition effect as the disposition that investors have to hold on to losing positions longer than winning positions, saying that investors would illustrate risk-seeking conduct by retaining the losers because they dislike losses and fear preventing them. Alternatively, investors will want to lock in money, so that they display risk-averse conduct by selling winners.

Dacey and Zielonka showed that the greater the level of stock prices volatility, the more prone the investor was to sell a loser, contrary to the disposition effect. This result explains the panic selling of stocks during a market collapse.

There is a suggestion that the disposition effect can be minimized by a mental approach called hedonic framing, which refers to a concept in behavioral finance and psychology where people perceive and react differently to gains and losses based on how they are presented or "framed." For example, individuals can try to force themselves to think of a single large gain as a number of smaller gains, to think of a number of smaller losses as a single large loss, to think of the combination of a major gain and a minor loss as a net minor gain, and, in the case of a combined major loss and minor gain, to think of the two separately. In a similar manner, investors show a reversed disposition effect when they are framed to think of their investment as progress towards a specific investment goal rather than a generic investment.

== See also ==
- Cognitive dissonance
- Endowment effect
- Escalation of commitment
- Loss aversion
- Status quo bias
