= László Garai =

Hungarian psychologist (1935–2019)

Laszlo Garai
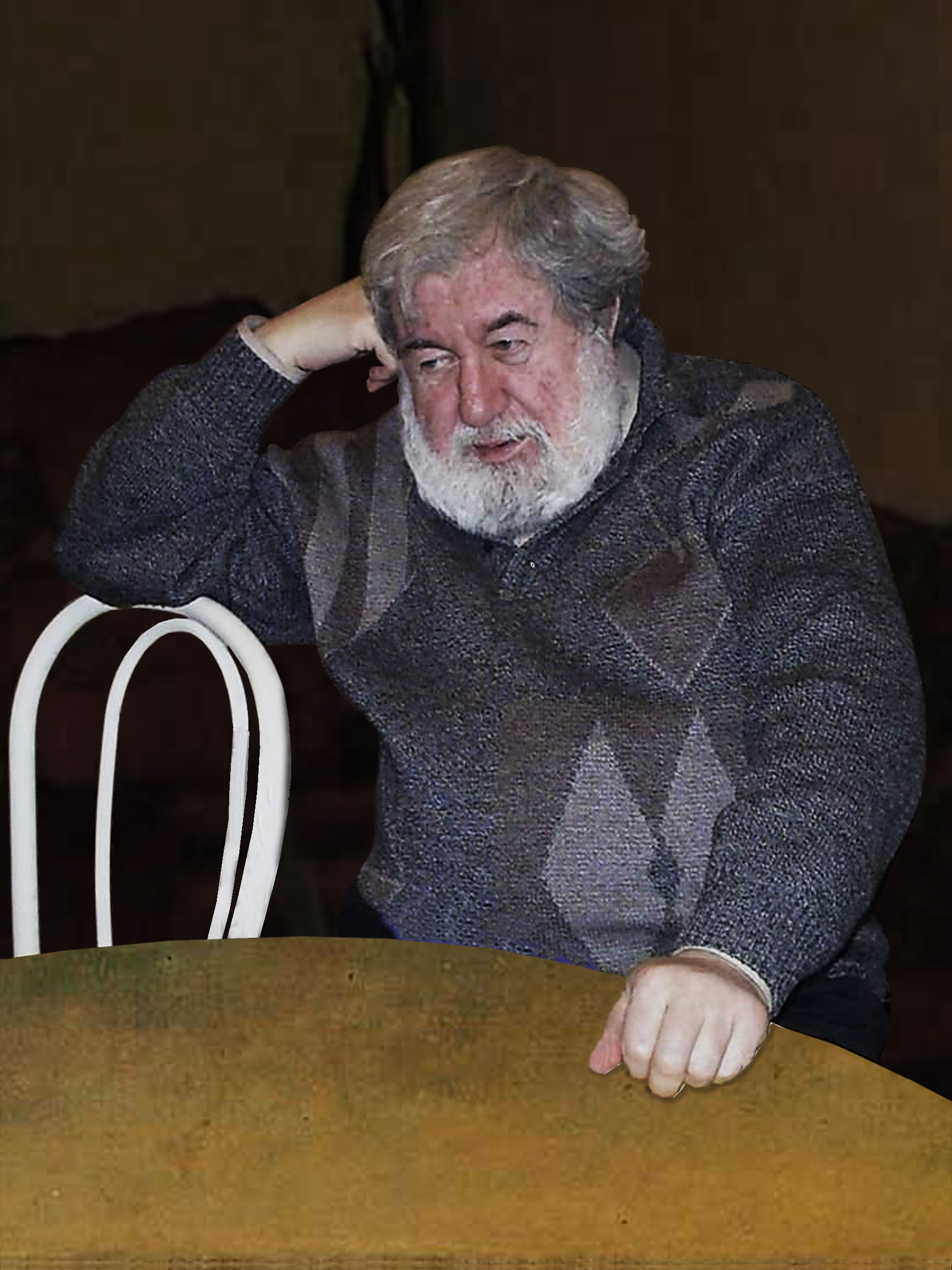
- Garai in 2010

László Garai (29 August 1935 — 25 May 2019) was a Hungarian scholar of psychology, specialising in the fields of theoretical psychology, social psychology and economic psychology.

== Early life ==
Garai was born in Budapest. He graduated in philosophy and psychology from the Faculty of Arts of Budapest University (1959).

He obtained his Candidate degree from the Hungarian Academy of Sciences with a thesis on a specifically human basic need (1968).

He obtained his Doctor of Science degree from the Hungarian Academy of Science with a thesis on social identity and paradoxes of its psychic elaboration (1988).

== Teaching ==
Moscow State Univ. (1969—theoretical psychology)

Nice Univ. (from 1981—social psychology)

California State Univ. (Bakersfield and San Bernardino, 1990—economic psychology)

University of Szeged (formerly: Attila Jozsef Univ. – 1994–2005; from 1997 – prof. of economic psychology; 1997–2000 – head of Dept of Economic Psychology he founded)

== Professional work ==
László Garai started his career as editor at the Encyclopaedia Department of the Hungarian academic publishing house Akadémiai Kiadó. After the defence of his thesis above on specifically basic human need, he concluded this research as a fellow of the Institute for Philosophy of the Hungarian Academy of Sciences (1964–1971). According to his hypothesis, a paradoxical need for a needfree activity is specific for humans and substantial for their other needs. The structure of the hypothesized need is isomorphic with that of the work considered as a "specifically human basic activity" and defined as that of arranging in one and the same structure ends and means. The hypothesis is based on the activity theory of Alexei Leontiev.

He won a Keldysh Scholarship (post doctoral scholarship founded by Keldysh, president of the USSR Academy of Sciences, to support joint Soviet-Hungarian academic research projects) to the Department of scientific discoveries’ psychology in the Institute for History of Natural Sciences and Technology in the Soviet Academy of Sciences (Moscow, 1969–1970)). There Garai studied simultaneous scientific discoveries (such as that of Bolyai and Lobachevsky).

In 1970, Garai founded in the Institute for Psychology of the Hungarian Academy of Sciences a research unit that became the first in Hungary research team of economic psychology and a center of Vygotskian theoretical research. head of that department (1971–79) and research advisor (1998–2002). He worked at the Laboratoire Européen de Psychologie Sociale (Paris, 1971, 1973 and 1977) and directed psycho-economic research supported by the National Scientific Research Foundation (1990–2005).

Garai was a member of the advisory board of the Hungarian Ministry of Finance. He was on the editorial board of the Journal of Russian and East European Psychology.

== Selected publications ==
- 1966 : "Problèmes des besoins spécifiquement humains." Récherches Internationales: Psychologie. [Paris] 9. (51). 42–60.
- 1966 : "Историко-материалистический подход к проблеме специфически-человеческих потребностей" ("The problem of the specifically human needs approached by historical materialism"). Вопросы психологии (Voprosy Psikhology). 3. 61–73.
- 1968 : "Las necesidades específicamente humanas" in: A. Luria, A. Massucco Costa, R. Zazzo and B. Teplov: Problemática científica de la psicología actual. Editorial Orbelus. Buenos Aires. 63–85)
- 1969 : Személyiségdinamika és társadalmi lét (Personality dynamics and social existence). Budapest: Akadémiai Kiadó [Academic Press]; 231 p. -- "Review:" F. Erős: Personality Dynamics and Social Existence, by L. Garai. European Journal of Social Psychology. 4/3 [1974]. pp. 369–379 doi:10.1002/ejsp.2420040308
- 1969 : "La régulation communicative de la relation sociale et le devenir conscient des contenus de mémoire". In: J. Janousek (szerk.): Experimental social psychology: Papers and reports from the International Conference on Social Psychology: Institute of Psychology, Czechoslovak Academy of Sciences. Prague, 1969.
- 1971 : "Hypothesis on the Motivation of Scientific Creativity". XIII International Congress of the History of Science. USSR, Moscow, August 18–24, 1971. "Nauka" Publishing House. M., 224–233.
- 1971 : "Гипотеза о мотивации научного творчества" ("Hypothesis on the Motivation of Scientific Creativity"). 13-ый Международный конгресс по истории науки. СССР, Москва, 18-24-го aвгустa 1971-го года (XIII International Congress of the History of Science. USSR, Moscow, August 18–24, 1971. Мoсквa: Изд. «Наука» ("Nauka" Publishing House. Moscow.)
- 1971: "Interpretation of needs in foreign language psychology and the question of motives of a scientific activity" [in Russian]. In: Iaroshevsky, M. (ed.): Problemy nauchnogo tvorchestva v sovremennoy psikhologii. M.: Nauka, 224–233.
- 1973 : "Strength and Weakness of Psychological Science". International Social Science Journal. 25. 447–460.
- 1973 : "La puissance et l'impuissance de la science psychologique". Revue Internationale des Sciences Sociales. 25. 491–504.
- 1978 : "Les Débuts de la catégorisation sociale et les manifestations verbales. Une étude longitudinale" (Co-author: M. Kocski; translation et adaptation: Paul Wald). Langage et Société. 4. (). 3–30.
- 1978 (with F. Eros) : "Marx's social theory and the concept of man in social psychology". Studia Psychologica. 20: 5–10
- 1979 "La régulation communicative de la relation sociale et le devenir conscient des contenus de mémoire". In: Prangishvili et al. (eds): The Unconscious. Vol. 3. Metsniereba. Tbilisi. 476–484.
- 1979 (with F. Eros, K. Járó, M. Köcski, S. Veres) : "Towards a Social Psychology of Personality: Development and Current Perspectives of a School of Social Psychology in Hungary". Social Science Information. 1: 137–166
- 1980 Szabadságszükséglet és esztétikum (The need for freedom and the aesthetics) Budapest: Akadémiai Kiadó [Academic Press]; 160 p.
- 1981 : "Les paradoxes de la catégorisation sociale". Recherches de Psychologie Sociale. 3. 131–141. R. Pages: "Les paradoxes classificatoires de Garai: espaces de repérage et d'affectation". Recherches de Psychologie Sociale. 1981. 143–151.
- 1983 : "Marxian Personality Psychology". In: Rom Harré, Roger Lamb, eds., The Encyclopedic Dictionary of Psychology. Oxford: Basil Blackwell. 364–366
- 1984 : "Vers une théorie psychoéconomique de l'identité sociale". Recherches Sociologiques. 313–335.
- 1985 : "Thesis on the Brain, Meaning and Dualism". Studia Psychologica. 27. 2. 157–168.
- 1986 : "Social Identity: Cognitive Dissonance or Paradoxe?" New Ideas in Psychology. 4:3. 311–322.
- 1987 : "Determining economic activity in a post-capitalist system". Journal of Economic Psychology. 8: 77–90
- 1988 : "Activity theory and social relations theory" (co-author: Margit Kocski). In: Hildebrand-Nielsohn, M. and Rückriem, G. (eds): Proceedings of the 1stInternational Congress on Activity Theory. Vol. 1. Berlin: Druck und Verlag System Druck. 119–129.
- 1988 : "Two Principles in Vygotsky's Heritage: Activity and Community" [co-author: Margit Kocski]. In: Erôs, F. and Kiss, Gy. (eds) Seventh European CHEIRON Conference Budapest, Hungary, 4–8 September 1988. Hungarian Psychological Association and Institute of Psychology of the Hungarian Academy of Sciences. Bp., 1988. 191–201)
- 1988 : Alkotáspszichológia felé: Esettanulmány József Attiláról (Toward a creativity psychology: A case study on Attila Jozsef). Budapest: Magyar Tudományos Akadémia (Hungarian Academy of Sciences)
- 1988 : "The case of Attila József: A reply to Gustav Jahoda" in New Ideas in Psychology 6:2. 213–217.
- 1989 : "The principle of social relations and the principle of activity" (co-author: M. Kocski). Soviet Psychology. 4. 50–69.
- 1990 : "...kis pénz - kis foci"? Egy gazdaságpszichológia megalapozása. (Foundation of an economic psychology). Budapest: Hungarian Economic Society.
- 1990 : "On the mental status of activity and social relation: To the question of continuity between the theories of Vygotsky and Leontiev" [in Russian; co-author: M. Kocski). Psykhologichesky Zhurnal, 11:5. (1990) 17–26.
- 1991 (with M. Kocski) : "Positivist and hermeneutic principles in psychology: activity and social categorisation". Studies in Soviet Thought. 42: 123–135 preview
- 1991 (with M. Kocski) : "Positivistische und hermeneutische Prinzipien in der Psychologie: Tätigkeit und gesellschaftliche Kategorisierung: Über die Frage von Kontinuität und Diskontinuität zwischen Vygotskij und Leont'ev". Europäische Zeitschrift für Semiotische Studien. Vol. 3 [1–2]. 1–15.
- 1993 : "...elvegyültem és kiváltam": Társadalomlélektani esszé az identitásról (A psychosocial essay on identity). Budapest: T-Twins. 231 p.
- 1995 : Quo vadis, tovaris? A modernizáció útjáról és a rajta vándorló emberrôl. Budapest: Scientia Humana
- 1996: Vygotskian implications: On the meaning and its brain. A keynote paper. In: Международная конференция „Культурно-исторический подход: Развитие гуманитарных наук и образования”. Proceedings. Российская Академия образования и Российский Государственный гуманитарный университет. Москва, 21-24-го октября 1996. No. 3.
- 1998 : Emberi potenciál mint tôke: bevezetés a gazdaságpszichológiába. Budapest: Aula Kiadó
- 1998 (with P. Popper) : Sajtópszichológia. Budapest: MÚOSz Bálint György Újságíró Akadémia
- 2003 : Identitásgazdaságtan: gazdaságpszichológia másképpen. Budapest: Tas
- 2005 : József Attila identitásai: alkotáspszichológiai esettanulmány. Budapest: Magyar Filmtörténeti Fotógyűjtemény Alapítvány
- 2008 : "A specifikusan emberi alapszükséglet" ("Specifically human basic need"). Magyar Tudomány 2008/9
- 2012 : Interview with Laszlo Garai on the Activity Theory of Alexis Leontiev and his own Theory of Social Identity as referred to the meta-theory of Lev Vygotsky. Journal of Russian and East European Psychology, vol. 50, no. 1, January–February 2012, pp. 50–64.
- 2013 : Theoretical_Psychology_Vygotskian_Writings
- 2017 : Reconsidering Identity Economics – Human Well-Being and Governance. New York: Palgrave Macmillan

== Bibliography ==
- F. Eros, "Personality Dynamics and Social Existence by L. Garai" [review article]. European Journal of Social Psychology vol. 3 (1974) pp. 369–379
- Miklós Gábor, "Interjú: Garai László" [interview]. Népszabadság. 26 January 1993: 19.
- Pogonyi Lajos, "A gazdaságnak is van identitása: beszélgetés Garai László pszichológussal" [interview]. Népszabadság. 22 February 2003.
