= Werner De Bondt =

Belgian economist (1954-)

- Born: 1954 (age 71–72); Belgium

Academic background
- Education: Cornell University Ph.D. 1985
- Influences: David Dreman, Jacques Ellul, Benjamin Graham, Karel (Galileo) Imbrechts, Daniel Kahneman, Wim Moesen, Paul Slovic, Richard Thaler, Amos Tversky, Lambert Vanthienen.

Academic work
- Discipline: Behavioral finance, behavioral economics, investment management, investor psychology, entrepreneurial beliefs and motivation, financial planning and investor advice
- Institutions: DePaul University 2002– University of Wisconsin–Madison 1984-2002

Werner F.M. De Bondt is one of the founders in the field of behavioral finance. He is also the founding director of Richard H. Driehaus Center for Behavioral Finance at DePaul University in Chicago. Previously, he was the Frank Graner Professor of Investment Management at the University of Wisconsin-Madison, and the Thomas F. Gleed Chair of Business Administration at Albers School of Business and Economics at the Seattle University.

== Life and career ==
He is a native of Belgium and an alumnus of Hagelstein (St.-Katelijne-Waver). He received a degree as Handelsingenieur from Universitaire Faculteiten Sint-Ignatius Antwerpen (Antwerp, Belgium). He subsequently earned an M.B.A. from the Catholic University of Louvain (Louvain, Belgium), a master's degree in Public Administration from Cornell University (Ithaca, New York) and a Ph.D. in Business Administration from Cornell University.

Alongside Daniel Kahneman, Amos Tversky, Hersh Shefrin, Meir Statman, Robert Shiller and Richard Thaler (with whom he co-wrote the seminal paper “Does the Stock Market Overreact? ” in 1985) De Bondt helped define the field of behavioral (or psychological) finance long before it became popular. He has investigated key research questions such as the intuitive tendency of naïve investors to extrapolate past trends in stock prices and corporate earnings, market overreaction, bubbles, the excessive self-confidence of traders, and their herding instinct. His work has been published in numerous academic journals (including the Journal of Finance, the Financial Analysts Journal, the European Economic Review, and the American Economic Review) and De Bondt has been cited in many European and U.S. news publications, including the Chicago Tribune, Finanz und Wirtschaft, the Frankfurter Allgemeine Zeitung, the Neue Zürcher Zeitung, the Milwaukee Journal Sentinel, De Standaard, Trends, BNQ Perspectives on banking, Elliott Wave International, LESSAC, De Tijd, the Wall Street Journal and others.

Professor De Bondt has been a guest on various TV programs including PBS and Kanaal Z with Veronique Goossens. He speaks at many conferences organized by universities and government agencies. He has served on the editorial boards of several academic journals, including the Journal of Behavioral Finance, the Financial Analysts Journal, the British Accounting Review, the Journal of Empirical Finance, and Behavioral Science & Policy.

== Published Books/Monographs ==
- Financial Accounting and Investment Management, edited book in two volumes, Edward Elgar Publishing, 2009
- The Psychology of World Equity Markets, edited book in two volumes, Edward Elgar Publishing, 2005
- Earnings Forecasts and Share Price Reversals, AIMR, Charlottesville, Virginia, 1992

== Selected published articles ==
- "Time-varying Risk Behavior and Prior Investment Outcomes: Evidence from Italy," Judgment and Decision-Making, September 2018 (with Andrea Lippi, Laura Barbieri and Mariacristina Piva), 2018 (September).
- "Mind Over Money: The Behavioral Revolution in Finance, " Revue Bancaire et Financière, 2018
- "Looking Into the Future: How Investors Forecast the Stock Market, " (with J. Michael Collins and Karl-Erik Warneryd) in A. Lewis (ed.), Cambridge Handbook of Psychology and Economic Be-havior, Cambridge University Press, 2017
- "Crisis of Authority, " in A.G. Malliaris, L. Shaw and H. Shefrin (eds.), The Global Financial Crisis and its Aftermath, Oxford University Press, 2016
- "After the Crisis: How to Restore Trust in Business and Finance," Spanish Journal of Finance and Accounting (Revista Española de Financiación y Contabilidad), 2013
- "Asset Bubbles: Insights from Behavioral Finance, " in Douglas D. Evanoff, George G. Kaufman and A.G. Malliaris (eds.), New Perspectives on Asset Price Bubbles: Theory, Evidence, and Policy, Oxford University Press, 2012
- "The Crisis of 2008 and Financial Reform," Qualitative Research in Financial Markets, 2010
- "Style Investing Within the S&P-500 Index," (with H.-L. Chen), Journal of Empirical Finance, 2004
- "Portrait Psychologique de l’Investisseur Individuel en Europe," (with P. Zurstrassen and A. Arzeni), Revue d'Economie Financiėre, 2002
- "A Portrait of the Individual Investor," European Economic Review, 1998
- "R&D Budgets and Corporate Earnings Targets" (with M. Bange), Journal of Corporate Finance, 1998
- "Betting on Trends: Intuitive Forecasts of Financial Risk and Return," International Journal of Forecasting, 1993
- "Do Security Analysts Overreact?" (with R. Thaler), The American Economic Review, 1990
- "Does the Stock Market Overreact?" (with R. Thaler), The Journal of Finance, 1985
