= Hersh Shefrin =

Canadian economist (born 1948)

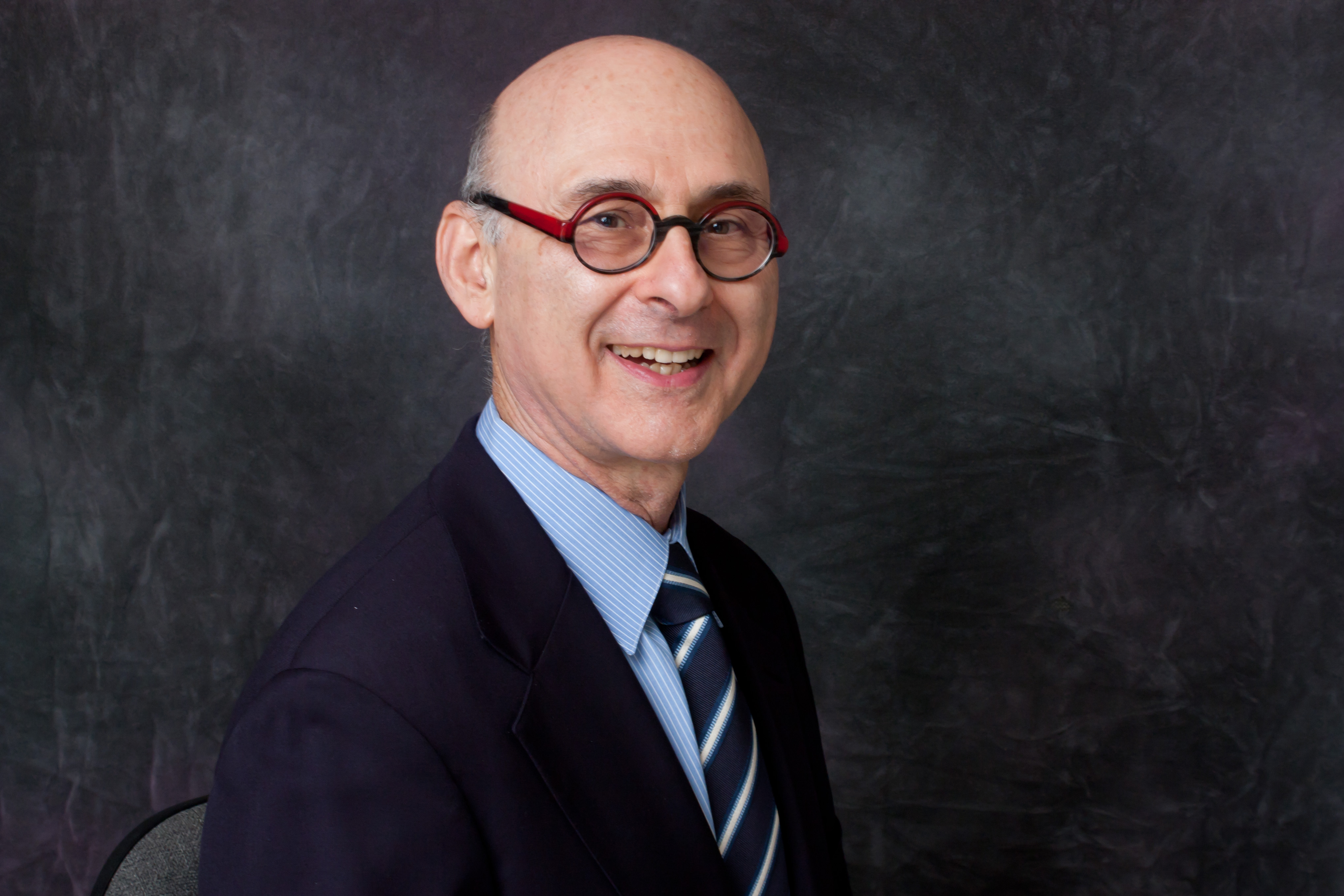
- Photograph by Greg Pio
- Born: July 27, 1948 (age 78); Winnipeg, Manitoba, Canada
- Occupations: Academic; Author
- Known for: Pioneer in developing modern behavioral economics and finance

Hersh Shefrin (born in Winnipeg, Manitoba, Canada) is an economist best known for his pioneering work in modern behavioral economics and behavioral finance. His contributions to the development of these fields include many books and articles. Several of his early articles on behavioral topics were done in collaboration with economists Richard Thaler and Meir Statman.

== Personal life ==
Shefrin was born in Winnipeg, Manitoba to a Jewish family. His mother, Clara Shefrin (née Danzker; 1918–2012) and father Sam Shefrin (1916–1972) raised him and two younger sisters. Since 1970 he has been married to Arna Shefrin (née Saper) whose careers spanned academia, healthcare, clinical research, and medical writing.

== Education ==
Shefrin received his B.S. from the University of Manitoba in 1970, where he did a double honours program in economics and mathematics. At the University of Waterloo in 1971 he worked in the area of Bayesian combinatorics and received his M.Math degree in combinatorics and optimization. In 1974, he earned a Ph.D. in economics from the London School of Economics.

Shefrin's M. Math supervisor was the graph theorist Frank Harary. His Ph.D. supervisors were economic theorists Frank Hahn and Lucien Foldes. His dissertation was in the economics of information and focused on developing an approach to equilibrium in which:

- information can feature either a fixed or varying structure
- informational constraints can inhibit markets from clearing
- advertising messages can be individualized
- search processes are central to decision-making

== Academic career ==
After completing his doctoral studies, Shefrin began his academic career at the University of Rochester. He was on faculty at Rochester between 1974 and 1979. During this time, his most important work was in behavioral economics, when he and Nobel laureate Richard Thaler became each other's first behavioral collaborators.

After leaving Rochester, Shefrin joined the economics department at Santa Clara University. There he continued his research with Thaler, and began a collaboration with Meir Statman, who was in the finance department. In 1990, Shefrin joined Statman in the finance department at Santa Clara, where he has been ever since.

Shefrin has also intermittently taught at other institutions, such as New York University, Aalto University in Helsinki, the Amsterdam Institute of Finance, the Free University of Amsterdam, IE University in Madrid, Tel Aviv University, the Interdisciplinary Center in Israel, the University of Zurich, USI in Lugano Switzerland, the University of Crete, and the Max Planck Institute in Berlin.

== Academic writings ==
=== Academic papers 1978–2000 ===
Shefrin's research with Thaler focused on developing a psychological-based framework for studying the economics of self-control. The most novel element of their self-control theory was a two-system structure, which they called the "planner-doer model". At the 2017 Nobel prize awards ceremony, the chair of the Nobel selection committee highlighted the planner-doer framework.

In February 1978, at a seminar at the National Bureau of Economic Research (West), located at Stanford University, Shefrin and Thaler presented the planner-doer model to psychologists Daniel Kahneman and Amos Tversky. At the time, Kahneman and Tversky's formal frameworks were one-system models. Later, in 2011, Kahneman's book, Thinking, Fast and Slow, would explain the central role of the two-system approach to behavioral decision-making. Shefrin and Thaler's planner-doer model was the first formal two-system framework in economics and finance.

During his time at Rochester, Shefrin's other research involved neoclassically oriented projects such as generalizing the key ideas in his dissertation, the economics of student loans, a transaction cost-based theory of money (now applicable to crypto-assets), and equilibrium models for the case when agents possess differential information.

After joining the economics department at Santa Clara University, Shefrin continued his research with Thaler, extending the two-system approach for analyzing self-control issues to include temptation and mental accounting. They applied this extended approach to the study of saving behavior and called their framework "behavioral life cycle theory." The BLC subsequently provided the framework for the savings program developed by Thaler and Shlomo Benartzi called "Save More Tomorrow," which, in turn, served as the template for the "nudge" approach which was developed by Thaler and Cass Sunstein.

During the 1980s and 1990s, Shefrin and Statman applied behavioral ideas to the field of finance, calling their approach "behavioral finance," a term which had not previously been in use. Their work offered explanations for such phenomena as the dividend puzzle, investors' disposition to sell winners too early and hold losers too long, the design and marketing of financial products, behavioral beta, behavioral portfolio theory, and a behavioral approach to financial market regulation based on the concept of fairness and/or ethics. Shefrin and Statman's paper on the dividend puzzle was the first in finance to apply prospect theory, the approach developed by Kahneman and Tversky to explain how people choose among risky prospects.

Shefrin and Statman coined the term "disposition effect" for investors' disposition to sell winners too early and hold losers too long. They proposed that the disposition effect reflects four psychological elements, namely loss aversion (from Kahneman and Tversky's prospect theory value function), mental accounting, regret avoidance, and lack of self-control. Shefrin has long argued that the disposition effect reflects how these four elements combine. In particular, he contends that prospect theory alone does not explain the full extent of disposition behavior, especially its self-nudging features. The disposition effect has become the most studied, in the academic finance literature, of psychological behavior patterns exhibited by individual investors.

In December 1984, Shefrin and Statman organized the first session in behavioral finance at the American Finance Association. Shefrin chaired the session and Statman presented their paper on the disposition effect. At the same session, Werner De Bondt and Thaler presented their work on "the overreaction effect."

Shefrin coined the phrase "excessive rationality assumption bias" to describe neoclassical economists' reluctance to recognize the degree of imperfect rationality in human decision-making. In contrast, the behavioral approach focuses on the impact of bounded rationality on economic and financial decisions.

Shefrin uses the phrase "modern behavioral economics and finance" to refer to the behavioral field which has developed since the mid-1970s. He notes that by virtue of their work combining economics and psychology, major economists from previous generations, such as Adam Smith, Irving Fisher, John Maynard Keynes, and Herbert Simon all qualify as behavioral economists. As noted by Thaler and Shefrin (1981), Adam Smith, in his 1759 book The Theory of Moral Sentiments, employed a two-system perspective. The behavioral framework prospect theory, developed by Kahneman and Tversky, for which Kahneman received the economics Nobel in 2002, has as its foundation the work of economic Nobel laureates Harry Markowitz (1953) and Maurice Allais (1953).

During the 1980s, Shefrin worked on non-behavioral topics such as second-best theory, incomplete markets, consumer aggregation, option pricing, and women's quest for economic equality.

=== Books from 1999 forward ===
During the 1990s, Shefrin began to concentrate exclusively on behavioral issues, and to work on his first book, Beyond Greed and Fear, published by Harvard Business School Press in 1999. The main theme of this book is that psychological phenomena permeate the entire landscape of finance. Shefrin's three-volume edited collection (drawn from the behavioral literature) from 2000, titled Behavioral Finance, shares the same theme.

In the two decades between 2000 and 2020, Shefrin's work focused on the development of theoretical frameworks for applying the behavioral approach to corporate finance, asset pricing, and risk management respectively. These initiatives resulted in a series of books, Behavioral Corporate Finance (2007, 2018), A Behavioral Approach to Asset Pricing (2005, 2008), and Behavioral Risk Management (2016), each with a specific theme.

The theme of Behavioral Corporate Finance is that corporate financial decisions and their associated outcomes reflect the interaction between two elements: the degree to which corporate managers and directors are influenced by psychological phenomena, and the degree to which financial markets are efficient.

The theme of A Behavioral Approach to Asset Pricing is that psychological phenomena distort the shape of the pricing kernel, which underlies the pricing of all assets. Typically, a behavioral pricing kernel features an oscillating pattern, whereas a neoclassical pricing kernel features a monotone declining pattern.

The theme of Behavioral Risk Management is that psychological phenomena underlie every major risk management failure that has occurred since 2000. This is especially true of the global financial crisis, an event to which the book devotes several chapters.

Along with armed conflict, global warming is arguably the biggest long-term challenge facing the human race. Since 2007, global warming has been a persistent theme in Shefrin's work. The theme of his book, The Behavioral Economics and Politics of Global Warming, published in 2023, is what he calls the "big behavioral question:" This question asks why, for decades, global decisions about addressing global warming have ignored the advice offered by mainstream economists. Shefrin's suggested answer features many psychological phenomena, with the most important being "present bias."

Each of Shefrin's four books just described constitute firsts of a kind. Beyond Greed and Fear was the first book to provide a comprehensive treatment of behavioral finance, focused on the judgments and decisions of financial practitioners. Behavioral Corporate Finance was the first book applying the behavioral perspective to analyzing the full spectrum of corporate financial decisions. In this regard, the term "behavioral corporate finance" was not in use before Shefrin's 2001 article titled "Behavioral Corporate Finance." A Behavioral Approach to Asset Pricing was the first book to develop behavioral pricing kernel theory. The Behavioral Economics and Politics of Global Warming was the first comprehensive treatment of how behavioral ideas can explain the failure to address climate change appropriately.

=== Academic papers from 2001 forward ===
In a series of papers, some co-authored, Shefrin expanded on the themes developed in his books. His work in behavioral asset pricing focuses on:

- analysts' reluctance to use the standard techniques of textbook finance when making valuation judgments
- the extension of behavioral pricing kernel theory to cover ESG investing
- the use of survey data to identify the factor structure underlying investors' empirical expectations about risk and return
- the role of sentiment in the pricing of bitcoin

His work in behavioral corporate finance focuses on:

- the role of focal points in corporate decisions about investment and financing
- corporate culture issues stemming from Herbert Simon's seminal work Administrative Behavior, for which Simon received the economics Nobel in 1978

Shefrin's work in behavioral risk management analyzes:

- the framework developed by the economist Hyman Minsky
- public policy associated with the COVID-19 pandemic
- financial literacy
- AI

In 2015, Shefrin began to apply the term "unfinished business" to work begun earlier that was still incomplete. In the mid-2020s, he focused on two unfinished business projects. The first is a chapter contribution to the second edition of The Handbook of Utility Theory, updating his contribution from thirty years earlier. The updated chapter has as its theme the contention that the two-system approach is superior to the one-system approach for explaining the real-world behavior of economic agents, both at the microeconomic level and the macroeconomic level. In addition, the chapter notes that the planner and doer, as concepts, are identified with specific neurological regions, making the planner-doer framework the first formal model in the field of neuroeconomics.

A second piece of unfinished business is his paper on women's quest for economic equality, which he began in the 1980s with the late Stanford economist Victor Fuchs. In 2025, he updated this paper, which uses game theory to study the theme of child care subsidies helping women. The updated paper drew on 35 years of empirical work that had since emerged, and applied the theory to analyze policy decisions internationally, and especially in the U.S.

== Applying behavioral economics and finance ==
Shefrin writes a monthly blog post for Forbes, discussing insights from the behavioral approach for a wide series of real-world issues and events. Such issues and events include:

- the IPO of Twitter
- the payout policy of Apple Computer
- the use of Minsky's framework to assess financial fragility in China and the U.S.
- the divergence between the price of Tesla's stock and its corresponding valuation based on free cash flow forecasts
- biases in mortality forecasts from COVID-19
- the inadequate global response to global warming
- excessive rationality assumption bias in traditional economic theories of bank runs

Several of the points discussed in Shefrin's Forbes' posts proved prescient. Examples include:

- the return patterns for the stocks of Twitter (after its IPO in 2013) and Apple (after the change in its payout policy in 2014)
- identification of Minsky-fragility (in May 2017) and subsequent Minsky moment in China's economic and financial systems (in October 2023)
- the subsequent inadequacy of the 2015 Paris climate agreement with respect to reducing global carbon emissions to meet stated goals (in January 2016)
- the COVID-19 mortality rates in the U.S. being much higher than the official forecasts but in line with Shefrin's posts at the outset of the pandemic (April 2020)
- the unheeded warning (made in April 2020) that policy makers needed to exercise caution, lest their response to the Covid-pandemic produce inflation, which did subsequently materialize
- the concern (expressed in September 2024) that for psychological reasons, U.S. voters did not understand that tariffs tax what they buy, and should not be regarded simply as penalties on foreign countries
- the presence of excessive rationality assumption bias in traditional economic theories of bank runs (October 2022), associated with the work recognized by the awarding of the 2022 economics Nobel, and the subsequent series of bank runs in 2023 beginning with the failure of Silicon Valley Bank (post of March 2023)

Shefrin wrote that he was particularly proud of his Forbes post in October 2020, which described the contribution of his late uncle Frank Shefrin (1913–1989) to the World Food Programme, the recipient of the 2020 Nobel peace prize. Frank Shefrin was instrumental in the founding of the WFP and played a major role in its subsequent development. Frank Shefrin was also a major influence on Hersh Shefrin as a young boy, and encouraged him to pursue a career in economics.

Shefrin's Forbes posts discuss the widespread impact of psychological phenomena on real-world behavior. Two of the major themes he consistently analyzes are (1) the weak global policy response to climate change; and (2) persistent overvaluation bias in equity markets.

In respect to overvaluation bias, Shefrin's posts regularly identify how specific analyst valuation methodologies are at odds with standard textbook techniques. His academic work describes possible reasons for why this is the case, including reluctance within the financial sector to discuss the issue openly. These reasons are different from those associated with neoclassical economists, who are subject to excessive rationality assumption bias.

Shefrin's posts also provide new insight into a pattern identified in the 1980s in which most stock returns occur overnight rather than during the trading day. In one of his posts, Shefrin reports that this pattern has an underlying day-of-the-week effect, supporting the hypothesis advanced by some that quantitative traders engage in manipulative practices to boost stock prices.

Besides writing for Forbes, Shefrin has also contributed to the HuffPost, Vox, and The Wall Street Journal. In addition, his book Ending the Management Illusion discusses a variety of real-world business cases to illustrate the importance of corporate culture in mitigating vulnerability to psychologically induced decision biases. The history of the firms subsequent to the publication of the book provides a sense of the power of the approach. For example, the book, published in 2008, identified cultural weaknesses at companies such as BP, Southwest Airlines, and Bay Networks. Between 2010 and 2013:

- BP experienced the Deepwater Horizon disaster; a subsequent blue-ribbon government panel attributed the disaster to weak risk culture
- the roof of a Southwest Airlines plane ripped open in mid-flight
- Bay Networks went bankrupt and failed

== Honors and awards ==
Graham and Dodd Scroll, for "Ethics, Fairness and Efficiency in Financial Markets," with Meir Statman, Financial Analysts Journal, 1993.

William F. Sharpe Prize for best paper appearing in the Journal of Financial and Quantitative Analysis, with Meir Statman, 2000.

Best paper award for "Trading Volume, Information, and Trading Costs: Empirical Analysis," with Kee Ho Chung and Hoje Jo, Journal of Korean Securities Association, 2002.

Among top 15 economic theorists to have influenced empirical work in microeconomics, American Economic Review, Pierre-André Chiappori and Steven Levitt, 2003.

Honorary Doctorate, University of Oulu, Finland, 2006.

Winner of 2008 IMCA Journalism Award, "How the Disposition Effect and Momentum Impact Investment Professionals," Monitor and Journal of Investment Consulting, 8, no. 2, Summer 2007.

Honorary Guest Professor, Central South University, Changsha, Hunan, China, 2007–2012.

Best book of 2000, and among top 10 books of the decade, Beyond Greed and Fear, JPMorgan Chase, 2010.

Honorary presenter of Tinbergen Institute Finance Lectures, Amsterdam, the Netherlands, 2014.

Best paper award for "Investors' Judgments, Asset Pricing Factors, and Sentiment," European Financial Management, 2015.

Best paper award for "Focal Points and Firm Risk," European Financial Management, with Ye Cai, 2018.

Best paper award for "Unfinished Business: A Multicommodity Intertemporal Planner-Doer Framework," Review of Behavioral Finance (special issue in honor of Richard Thaler's Nobel prize), 2018.

Alumni of Distinction Lifetime Achievement, University of Manitoba, 2019.

Marquis' Who's Who (the Albert Nelson Marquis Lifetime Achievement Award), 2019.

Honorary position, vice-president, Herbert Simon Society, 2019–present.

== Books ==
- Beyond Greed and Fear: Understanding Behavioral Finance and the Psychology of Investing, 1999, Harvard Business School Press. Revised version published 2007, Oxford University Press
- Behavioral Finance, 2000. edited by Hersh Shefrin. Edward Elgar
- Behavioral Corporate Finance, 2006. McGraw-Hill/Irwin, second edition in 2018
- A Behavioral Approach to Asset Pricing, 2005. Elsevier; 2nd edition in 2008
- Ending the Management Illusion, 2008. McGraw-Hill
- Behavioralizing Finance, 2009. Foundations and Trends(r) in Finance
- Behavioral Risk Management, 2016. Palgrave-McMillan
- The Global Financial Crisis And its Aftermath: Hidden Factors in the Meltdown, edited by A.G. Malliaris, Leslie Shaw, and Hersh Shefrin, 2016, Oxford University Press
- The Behavioral Economics and Politics of Global Warming, 2023. Cambridge University Press

== Selected articles ==
- "Games with Self-Generating Distributions", Review of Economic Studies, 1981
- "On the Combinatorial Structure of Bayesian Learning with Imperfect Information", Discrete Mathematics, 1981
- "An Economic Theory of Self-Control", with Richard Thaler, Journal of Political Economy, 1981
- "The Disposition to Sell Winners Too Early and Ride Losers Too Long: Theory and Evidence", with Meir Statman, Journal of Finance, 1985
- "The Behavioral Life-Cycle Hypothesis", with Richard Thaler, Economic Inquiry, 1988
- "Ethics, Fairness and Efficiency in Financial Markets," with Meir Statman, Financial Analysts Journal, 1993.
- "Behavioral Portfolio Theory", with Meir Statman, Journal of Financial and Quantitative Analysis, 2000
- "Behavioral Corporate Finance", Journal of Applied Corporate Finance, 2001
- "Technical Analysis and Individual Investors", with Arvid Hoffmann, Journal of Economic Behavior and Organization, 2014
- "Focal Points and Firm Risk", with Ye Cai, European Financial Management, 2018
- "Overvaluation Bias and Limits to Nudges", Journal of Portfolio Management, 2019
- "Bitcoin and Sentiment", with Hoje Jo and Haehean Park, Journal of Futures Markets, 2020
- "The Psychology Underlying Biased Forecasts of COVID-19 Cases and Deaths in the United States", Frontiers in Psychology, 2020
- "ESG Investing and Behavioral Finance: Why ESG Investing is Primarily a Psychological Phenomenon", Journal of Investing, 2024
- "Reflections on Descriptive and Prescriptive Issues in Administrative Behavior, the Work for Which Herbert Simon Received the 1978 Nobel Memorial Prize in Economics", in Elgar Companion to Herbert Simon, edited by Gerd Gigerenzer, Shabnam Mousavi, and Riccardo Viale, 2024

== See also ==
- List of University of Waterloo people
