= CIRANO =

Canadian research center

Coordinates: 45.5011°N 73.5767°W

CIRANO (Centre Interuniversitaire de Recherche en Analyse des Organisations) is a research center that brings together a number of researches from several universities in Montreal (Canada), with the purpose of creation and transfer of knowledge on the analysis of organizations. It facilitates research in a variety of disciplines: economics, finance, management, information systems, computer science and operational research, psychology, sociology, political science, law, history, and medicine.

== Notable fellows ==
- Claude Castonguay
- Alain Dubuc
- Monique Jérôme-Forget
- Robert Lacroix
- Claude Montmarquette
