= Katy Milkman =

American economist

Katherine L. Milkman
- Education: Princeton University; Harvard University
- Scientific career
- Workplaces: University of Pennsylvania
- Thesis: Studies of intrapersonal conflict and its implications (2009)
- Website: Katherinemilkman.com

Katherine L. Milkman is an American economist who is the James G. Dinan endowed Professor at The Wharton School of the University of Pennsylvania. She was previously the president of the Society for Judgment and Decision Making.

== Early life and education ==
Milkman originally considered working on Wall Street, and spent her college holidays interning at investment banks. She was an undergraduate student at Princeton University, where she specialised in Operations Research and American studies. She moved to Harvard University for her graduate studies and completed a doctorate in information and technology in 2009.

== Research and career ==
Milkman moved to the University of Pennsylvania, where she was made assistant professor. She was promoted to Professor of Operations, Information and Decisions in 2018. She studies how economics and psychology can be used to change behaviour, including opinions on exercise, vaccine take-up and discrimination. Milkman makes use of big data to document this behavioural change in an effort to understand what results in failures of self-control.

During the COVID-19 pandemic, Milkman investigated the transmission of coronavirus disease, claiming that it relied on social habits that can be changed. She used her understanding of vaccine hesitancy to encourage people to accept the COVID-19 vaccine. She argued that getting people to wear masks would have been easier if people had considered them as fashion items as opposed to a burden.

== Awards and honors ==
- 2015 Associations in Behavioural & Brain Sciences Early Career Award from the Federation
- 2017 Finalist for Thinkers50
- 2019 Society for Personality and Social Psychology Robert B. Cialdini Prize
- 2019 Elected Fellow of the Association for Psychological Science
- 2020 Forbes 10 Behavioural Scientists You Should Know

== Selected publications ==
- Berger, Jonah; Milkman, Katherine L. (April 1, 2012). "What Makes Online Content Viral?". Journal of Marketing Research. 49 (2): 192–205. doi:10.1509/jmr.10.0353. ISSN 0022-2437. S2CID 29504532.
- Milkman, Katherine L.; Chugh, Dolly; Bazerman, Max H. (July 1, 2009). "How Can Decision Making Be Improved?". Perspectives on Psychological Science. 4 (4): 379–383. doi:10.1111/j.1745-6924.2009.01142.x. ISSN 1745-6916. PMID 26158985. S2CID 643793.
- Benartzi, Shlomo; Beshears, John; Milkman, Katherine L.; Sunstein, Cass R.; Thaler, Richard H.; Shankar, Maya; Tucker-Ray, Will; Congdon, William J.; Galing, Steven (August 1, 2017). "Should Governments Invest More in Nudging?". Psychological Science. 28 (8): 1041–1055. doi:10.1177/0956797617702501. ISSN 0956-7976. PMC 5549818. PMID 28581899.

=== Bibliography ===
- Milkman, Katy (2021). How to Change: The Science of Getting from Where You Are to Where You Want to Be. Ebury Publishing. ISBN 9781473593824.
