= Claude Montmarquette =

Canadian economist (1942–2021)

- Born: 20 December 1942; Montreal, Quebec, Canada
- Died: 8 September 2021 (aged 78); Montreal, Quebec, Canada
- Occupation: Economist

Claude Montmarquette CM (20 December 1942 – 8 September 2021) was a Canadian economist. He taught at the Université de Montréal for several decades.

== Biography ==
Montmarquette studied at the Université de Montréal and earned a degree in economic sciences. He then earned a Ph.D. from the University of Chicago. He became a researcher at CIRANO and at the Centre de recherche en développement économique. He became a member of the Royal Society of Canada in 1998 for his contributions to the fields of experimental economics and applied econometrics. In 2005, he was a signatory of Pour un Québec lucide.

Montmarquette led the experimental economics department at the Université de Montréal from 2005 to 2012. In 2010, he was elected to the Académie des Grands Montréalais. He became a Member of the Order of Canada in 2012. In 2013, he became a doctor honoris causa at McGill University.

Claude Montmarquette died in Montreal on 8 September 2021 at the age of 78.

== Articles ==
- Lévy-Garboua, Louis; Masclet, David; Montmarquette, Claude (2007). "Fiscalité et offre de travail : Une étude expérimentale". Économie & Prévision (4): 135–145. doi:10.3917/ecop.175.0135.
- Page, Lionel; Levy Garboua, Louis; Montmarquette, Claude (2007). "Aspiration levels and educational choices: An experimental study". Economics of Education Review. 26 (6): 747–757. doi:10.1016/j.econedurev.2007.06.001.
- Lévy-Garboua, Louis; Montmarquette, Claude; Villeval, Marie Claire (2008). "Responsabilité individuelle et fiscalité". Économie & Prévision: 19–31. doi:10.3917/ecop.182.0019.
