= Kevin Volpp =

American behavioral economist

Kevin G. Volpp is an American behavioral economist and Mark V. Pauly President's Distinguished Professor at the University of Pennsylvania’s Perelman School of Medicine and the Wharton School. He is the Director of the Penn Center for Health Incentives & Behavioral Economics (CHIBE).

== Education ==
Volpp earned his bachelor’s degree magna cum laude in biology from Harvard and was a Rotary Scholar at Freie Universitat in Berlin, Germany. He earned an MD from the University of Pennsylvania’s Perelman School of Medicine and a PhD from the Wharton School from the graduate group in Applied Economics and Managerial Science.

== Appointments ==
Volpp is the Director of the Center for Health Incentives and Behavioral Economics and Scientific Lead of the American Heart Association Health Care by Food Initiative. Previously, he served as the Division Chief of Health Policy with the Department of Medical Ethics and Health Policy at the Perelman School of Medicine. For 20 years, he also served as an attending physician at the Philadelphia VA Medical Center and worked as a part-time primary care clinician and hospitalist.

== Research ==
Volpp’s research applies principles of behavioral economics to improve health and health care. One study led by Volpp was a large randomized trial of financial incentives and smoking cessation among employees at General Electric. Long-term quit rates from a $750 incentive were approximately three times higher in the intervention group. The main trial paper led GE to implement a benefit design change based on this study to its 150,000 US employees. Follow-up work extended this among employees at CVS and also demonstrated a tripling in long-term smoking cessation rates and led to a national program among CVS employees called “700 Good Reasons.” This was followed by a large-scale study of financial incentives and smoking cessation that found that offering standard pharmacologic therapies and e-cigarettes were no more effective than control whereas either gain- or loss-framed incentives tripled smoking cessation rates among employees of 54 different employers

His team has also conducted studies examining the impact of behavioral economic strategies on increasing physical activity, medication adherence, and on physician behavior.

Volpp's research group also conducted a number of national evaluations of the 2003 and 2011 national duty hour regulations, the first to regulate work hours for physicians in the United States in a series of papers published in JAMA.

== Awards and honors ==
2005	Presidential Award for Early Career Scientists and Engineers (PECASE)
2010	British Medical Journal Group Awards for "Translating Research into Practice" for work on financial incentives and smoking cessation implemented by General Electric
2012	Elected to Institute of Medicine (now the National Academy of Medicine)
2015	Matilda White Riley Award for Distinguished Research Contributions from Office of Social and Behavioral Sciences, NIH Association for Clinical and Translational Science Distinguished Investigator Award for Translation from Clinical Use into Public Benefit and Policy
2019	John Eisenberg Award for Career Achievement in Research, Society of General Internal Medicine
2022	Distinguished Scientist Award from the American Heart Association
