= Nicholas Barberis =

British economist

- Born: September 1971 (age 55)

Academic background
- Education: Harvard University; Jesus College, Cambridge; Eltham College
- Doctoral advisor: John Y. Campbell; Gary Chamberlain; Kenneth A. Froot; Andrei Shleifer
- Influences: Richard Thaler

Academic work
- Discipline: Behavioral finance
- Institutions: Yale School of Management

Nicholas C. Barberis (born September 1971) is the Stephen & Camille Schramm Professor of Finance at the Yale School of Management. Professor Barberis' research focuses on behavioral finance and in particular, on applications of cognitive psychology to understanding the pricing of financial assets.

Barberis attended Eltham College in London, UK, earned his B.A. from Jesus College, Cambridge in 1991 and Ph.D. from Harvard University in 1996.
