= Thinking, Fast and Slow =

2011 book by Daniel Kahneman

- Hardcover edition
- Author: Daniel Kahneman
- Language: English language
- Subject: Psychology
- Genre: Non-fiction
- Publisher: Farrar, Straus and Giroux
- Publication date: 2011
- Publication place: United States
- Media type: Print (hardcover, paperback), audio
- Pages: 498 pages
- ISBN: 978-0374275631
- OCLC: 706020998

Thinking, Fast and Slow is a 2011 popular science book by the Israeli-American psychologist Daniel Kahneman. Its main thesis is a differentiation between two modes of thought: "System 1" is fast, instinctive and emotional; "System 2" is slower, more deliberative, and more logical.

The book delineates rational and non-rational motivations or triggers associated with each type of thinking process, and how they complement each other, starting with Kahneman's own research on loss aversion. From framing choices to people's tendency to replace a difficult question with one that is easy to answer, the book summarizes several decades of research to suggest that people have too much confidence in human judgment. Kahneman performed his own research, often in collaboration with the psychologist Amos Tversky, which enriched his experience to write the book. It covers different phases of his career: his early work concerning cognitive biases, his work on prospect theory and happiness, and with the Israel Defense Forces.

Jason Zweig, a columnist at The Wall Street Journal, helped write and research the book over two years. The book was a New York Times bestseller and was the 2012 winner of the American National Academies Communication Award for best creative work that helps the public understanding of topics in behavioral science, engineering and medicine. The integrity of some priming studies cited in the book has been called into question in the midst of the psychological replication crisis.

== Two systems ==
In the book's first section, Kahneman describes two different ways the brain forms thoughts:

- System 1: Fast, automatic, frequent, emotional, stereotypic, unconscious. Examples (in order of complexity) of things system 1 can do:
  - determine that an object is at a greater distance than another
  - localize the source of a specific sound
  - complete a common phrase (e.g. "war and ...")
  - display disgust when seeing a gruesome image
  - solve basic arithmetic (e.g. 2 + 2 = ?)
  - read text on a billboard
  - drive a car on an empty road
  - think of a good chess move (if one is a chess master)
  - understand simple sentences
- System 2: Slow, effortful, infrequent, logical, calculating, conscious. Examples of things system 2 can do:
  - prepare for the start of a sprint
  - direct attention towards certain people in a crowded environment
  - look for a person with a particular feature
  - try to recognize a sound
  - sustain a faster-than-normal walking rate
  - determine the appropriateness of a particular action in a social setting
  - count the number of A's or other letters in a given text
  - give one's own telephone number to someone else
  - park into a tight parking space
  - determine the price/quality ratio of two products
  - determine the validity of a complex logical reasoning
  - multiply two-digit numbers (e.g. 17 × 24)

Kahneman describes a number of experiments which purport to examine the differences between these two thought systems and how they arrive at different results even given the same inputs. Terms and concepts include coherence, attention, laziness, association, jumping to conclusions, WYSIATI (What you see is all there is), and how one forms judgments. The System 1 vs. System 2 debate includes the reasoning or lack thereof for human decision making, with big implications for many areas including law and market research.

== Heuristics and biases ==
The second section offers explanations for why humans struggle to think statistically. It begins by documenting a variety of situations in which we either arrive at binary decisions or fail to associate precisely reasonable probabilities with outcomes. Kahneman explains this phenomenon using the theory of heuristics. Kahneman and Tversky originally discussed this topic in their 1974 article titled Judgment Under Uncertainty: Heuristics and Biases.

Kahneman uses heuristics to assert that System 1 thinking involves associating new information with existing patterns, or thoughts, rather than creating new patterns for each new experience. For example, a child who has only seen shapes with straight edges might perceive an octagon when first viewing a circle. As a legal metaphor, a judge limited to heuristic thinking would only be able to think of similar historical cases when presented with a new dispute, rather than considering the unique aspects of that case. In addition to offering an explanation for the statistical problem, the theory also offers an explanation for human biases.

=== Anchoring ===
The "anchoring effect" names a tendency to be influenced by irrelevant numbers. Shown greater/lesser numbers, experimental subjects gave greater/lesser responses. As an example, most people, when asked whether Mahatma Gandhi was more than 114 years old when he died, will provide a much greater estimate of his age at death than others who were asked whether Gandhi was more or less than 35 years old. Experiments show that people's behavior is influenced, much more than they are aware, by irrelevant information.

=== Availability ===
The availability heuristic is a mental shortcut that occurs when people make judgments about the probability of events on the basis of how easy it is to think of examples. The availability heuristic operates on the notion that, "if you can think of it, it must be important". The availability of consequences associated with an action is related positively to perceptions of the magnitude of the consequences of that action. In other words, the easier it is to recall the consequences of something, the greater we perceive these consequences to be. Sometimes, this heuristic is beneficial, but the frequencies at which events come to mind are usually not accurate representations of the probabilities of such events in real life.

=== Conjunction fallacy ===
System 1 is prone to substituting a simpler question for a difficult one. In what Kahneman terms their "best-known and most controversial" experiment, "the Linda problem", subjects were told about an imaginary Linda, young, single, outspoken, and intelligent, who, as a student, was very concerned with discrimination and social justice. They asked whether it was more probable that Linda is a bank teller or that she is a bank teller and an active feminist. The overwhelming response was that "feminist bank teller" was more likely than "bank teller", violating the laws of probability. (All feminist bank tellers are bank tellers, so the former can't be more likely). In this case System 1 substituted the easier question, "Is Linda a feminist?", neglecting the occupation qualifier. An alternative interpretation is that the subjects added an unstated cultural implicature to the effect that the other answer implied an exclusive or, that Linda was not a feminist.

=== Optimism and loss aversion ===
Kahneman writes of a "pervasive optimistic bias", which "may well be the most significant of the cognitive biases." This bias generates the illusion of control: the illusion that we have substantial control of our lives.

A natural experiment reveals the prevalence of one kind of unwarranted optimism. The planning fallacy is the tendency to overestimate benefits and underestimate costs, impelling people to begin risky projects. In 2002, American kitchen remodeling was expected on average to cost $18,658, but actually cost $38,769.

To explain overconfidence, Kahneman introduces the concept he terms What You See Is All There Is (WYSIATI). This theory states that when the mind makes decisions, it deals primarily with Known Knowns, phenomena it has observed already. It rarely considers Known Unknowns, phenomena that it knows to be relevant but about which it does not have information. Finally it appears oblivious to the possibility of Unknown Unknowns, unknown phenomena of unknown relevance.

He explains that humans fail to take into account complexity and that their understanding of the world consists of a small and necessarily un-representative set of observations. Furthermore, the mind generally does not account for the role of chance and therefore falsely assumes that a future event will be similar to a past event.

=== Framing ===
Framing is the context in which choices are presented. Experiment: subjects were asked whether they would opt for surgery if the "survival" rate is 90 percent, while others were told that the mortality rate is 10 percent. The first framing increased acceptance, even though the situation was no different.

=== Sunk cost ===
Rather than consider the odds that an incremental investment would produce a positive return, people tend to "throw good money after bad" and continue investing in projects with poor prospects that have already consumed significant resources. In part this is to avoid feelings of regret.

== Overconfidence ==
This part (part III, sections 19–24) of the book is dedicated to the undue confidence in what the mind believes it knows. It suggests that people often overestimate how much they understand about the world and underestimate the role of chance in particular. This is related to the excessive certainty of hindsight, when an event seems to be understood after it has occurred or developed. Kahneman's opinions concerning overconfidence are influenced by the author Nassim Nicholas Taleb.

== Choices ==
In this section Kahneman returns to economics and expands his seminal work on Prospect Theory. He discusses the tendency for problems to be addressed in isolation and how, when other reference points are considered, the choice of that reference point (called a frame) has a disproportionate effect on the outcome. This section also offers advice on how some of the shortcomings of System 1 thinking can be avoided.

=== Prospect theory ===
Kahneman developed prospect theory, the basis for his Nobel prize, to account for experimental errors he noticed in Daniel Bernoulli's traditional utility theory. According to Kahneman, Utility Theory makes logical assumptions of economic rationality that do not represent people's actual choices, and does not take into account cognitive biases.

One example is that people are loss-averse: they are more likely to act to avert a loss than to achieve a gain. Another example is that the value people place on a change in probability (e.g., of winning something) depends on the reference point: people seem to place greater value on a change from 0% to 10% (going from impossibility to possibility) than from, say, 45% to 55%, and they place the greatest value of all on a change from 90% to 100% (going from possibility to certainty). This occurs despite the fact that by traditional utility theory all three changes give the same increase in utility. Consistent with loss-aversion, the order of the first and third of those is reversed when the event is presented as losing rather than winning something: there, the greatest value is placed on eliminating the probability of a loss to 0.

After the book's publication, the Journal of Economic Literature published a discussion of its parts concerning prospect theory, as well as an analysis of the four fundamental factors on which it is based.

== Two selves ==
The fifth part of the book describes recent evidence which introduces a distinction between two selves, the 'experiencing self' and 'remembering self'. Kahneman proposed an alternative measure that assessed pleasure or pain sampled from moment to moment, and then summed over time. Kahneman termed this "experienced" well-being and attached it to a separate "self". He distinguished this from the "remembered" well-being that the polls had attempted to measure. He found that these two measures of happiness diverged.

=== Life as a story ===
The author's significant discovery was that the remembering self does not care about the duration of a pleasant or unpleasant experience. Instead, it retrospectively rates an experience by the maximum or minimum of the experience, and by the way it ends. The remembering self dominated the patient's ultimate conclusion.

"Odd as it may seem," Kahneman writes, "I am my remembering self, and the experiencing self, who does my living, is like a stranger to me."

=== Experienced well-being ===
Kahneman first began the study of well-being in the 1990s. At the time most happiness research relied on polls about life satisfaction. Having previously studied unreliable memories, the author was doubtful that life satisfaction was a good indicator of happiness. He designed a question that emphasized instead the well-being of the experiencing self. The author proposed that "Helen was happy in the month of March" if she spent most of her time engaged in activities that she would rather continue than stop, little time in situations that she wished to escape, and not too much time in a neutral state that wouldn't prefer continuing or stopping the activity either way.

=== Thinking about life ===
Kahneman suggests that emphasizing a life event such as a marriage or a new car can provide a distorted illusion of its true value. This "focusing illusion" revisits earlier ideas of substituting difficult questions and WYSIATI.

== Awards and honors ==
- 2011 Los Angeles Times Book Prize (Current Interest)
- National Academy of Sciences Best Book Award in 2012
- The New York Times Book Review, one of the best books of 2011
- Globe and Mail Best Books of the Year 2011
- One of The Economist's 2011 Books of the Year
- One of The Wall Street Journal's Best Nonfiction Books of the Year 2011

== Reception ==
As of 2012 the book had sold over one million copies. On the year of its publication, it was on the New York Times Bestseller List. The book was reviewed in media including the Huffington Post, The Guardian, The New York Times, The Financial Times, The Independent, Bloomberg and The New York Review of Books.

The book was also widely reviewed in academic journals, including the Journal of Economic Literature, American Journal of Education, The American Journal of Psychology, Planning Theory, The American Economist, The Journal of Risk and Insurance, The Michigan Law Review, American Scientist, Contemporary Sociology, Science, Contexts, The Wilson Quarterly, Technical Communication, The University of Toronto Law Journal, A Review of General Semantics and Scientific American Mind. The book was also reviewed in the monthly magazine Observer, published by the Association for Psychological Science.

The book has achieved a large following among baseball scouts and baseball executives. The ways of thinking described in the book are believed to help scouts, who have to make major judgements off little information and can easily fall into prescriptive yet inaccurate patterns of analysis.

The last chapter of Paul Bloom's Against Empathy discusses concepts also touched in Daniel Kahneman's book, Thinking, Fast and Slow, that suggest people make a series of rational and irrational decisions. He criticizes the argument that "regardless of reason's virtues, we just aren't any good at it." His point is that people are not as "stupid as scholars think they are." He explains that people are rational because they make thoughtful decisions in their everyday lives. For example, when someone has to make a big life decision they critically assess the outcomes, consequences, and alternative options.

The author Nicholas Taleb has equated the book's importance to that of Adam Smith's The Wealth of Nations and Sigmund Freud's The Interpretation of Dreams.

== Replication crisis ==
The book has been heavily criticized for relying on shoddy and non-reproducible studies. It was discovered many prominent research findings were difficult or impossible for others to replicate, and thus the original findings were called into question. An analysis of the studies cited in chapter 4, "The Associative Machine", found that their replicability index (R-index) is 14, indicating essentially low to no reliability. Kahneman himself responded to the study in blog comments and acknowledged the chapter's shortcomings: "I placed too much faith in underpowered studies." Others have noted the irony in the fact that Kahneman made a mistake in judgment similar to the ones he studied.

A later analysis made a bolder claim that, despite Kahneman's previous contributions to the field of decision making, most of the book's ideas are based on "scientific literature with shaky foundations". A general lack of replication in the empirical studies cited in the book was given as a justification.

== See also ==
- Behavioral economics
- Cognitive reflection test
- Decision theory
- Dual process theory
- List of cognitive biases
- Outline of thought
- Peak–end rule
- Joseph E. LeDoux
- Noise: A Flaw in Human Judgment
