= Phi Beta Kappa Award in Science =

Annual book award

The Phi Beta Kappa Award in Science is given annually by Phi Beta Kappa society to authors of significant books in the fields of science and mathematics. The award was first given in 1959 to anthropologist Loren Eiseley.

== Award winners ==
Year	Book	Author	Subject
2024	What If We Get It Right? Visions of Climate Futures	Ayana Elizabeth Johnson	Global warming
2023	Origin: A Genetic History of the Americas	Jennifer Raff	Anthropology
2022	The Disordered Cosmos: A Journey into Dark Matter, Spacetime, & Dreams Deferred	Chanda Prescod-Weinstein	Cosmology
2021	The Sirens of Mars: Searching for Life on Another World	Sarah Stewart Johnson	Astrobiology
2020	Archaeology From Space: How the Future Shapes Our Past	Sarah Parcak	Archaeology
2019	Light of the Stars: Alien Worlds and the Fate of the Earth	Adam Frank	Astrobiology
2018	Behave: The Biology of Humans at Our Best and Worst	Robert Sapolsky	Biology
2017	The Gene: An intimate history	Siddhartha Mukherjee	Biology
2016	The Triumph of Seeds: How Grains, Nuts, Kernels, Pulses, & Pips Conquered the Plant Kingdom and Shaped Human History	Thor Hansen	Biology
2015	Animal Weapons: The Evolution of Battle	Douglas J. Emlen	Biology
2014	Einstein and the Quantum: The Quest of the Valiant Swabian	A. Douglas Stone	Quantum Physics
2013	The Signal and the Noise: Why Most Predictions Fail—but Some Don't	Nate Silver	Statistics
2012	The Fate of Greenland: Lessons from Abrupt Climate Change	Philip Conkling, Richard Alley, Wallace Broecker, and George Denton	Global warming
2011	Beyond Smoke and Mirrors: Climate Change and Energy in the 21st Century	Burton Richter	Global warming
2010	Complexity: A Guided Tour	Melanie Mitchell	Complexity
2009	The Art and Politics of Science	Harold Varmus	History of science
2008	Your Inner Fish: A Journey into the 3.5-Billion-Year History of the Human Body	Neil Shubin	Biology
2007	The Making of the Fittest: DNA and the Ultimate Forensic Record of Evolution	Sean B. Carroll	Biology
2006	Plows, Plagues, and Petroleum: How Humans Took Control of Climate	William F. Ruddiman	Climatology
2005	The Hunt for the Dawn Monkey: Unearthing the Origins of Monkeys, Apes and Humans	K. Christopher Beard	Biology
2004	Isaac Newton	James Gleick	Physics
2003	Life on a Young Planet: The First Three Billion Years of Evolution on Earth	Andrew H. Knoll	Biology
2002	A Brain for All Seasons: Human Evolution & Abrupt Climate Change	William H. Calvin	Climatology
2001	The Two-Mile Time Machine: Ice Cores, Abrupt Climate Change, and Our Future	Richard B. Alley	Climatology
2000	Cradle of Life: The Discovery of the Earth's Earliest Fossils	J. William Schopf	Paleontology
1999	The Elegant Universe: Superstrings, Hidden Dimensions, and the Quest for the Ultimate Theory	Brian Greene	Cosmology
1998	Taking Wing: Archaeopteryx & The Evolution of Bird Flight	Pat Shipman	Paleontology
1997	Guns, Germs, and Steel: The Fates of Human Societies	Jared Diamond	Sociology
1996	Where Does the Weirdness Go? Why Quantum Mechanics is Strange, But Not as Strange as You Think	David Lindley	Physics
1995	Journey to the Ants: A Story of Scientific Exploration	Edward O. Wilson, Bert Hölldobler	Biology
1994	Black Holes and Time Warps: Einstein's Outrageous Legacy	Kip Thorne	Physics
1993	Living Within Limits: Ecology, Economics, and Population Taboos	Garrett Hardin	Ecology
1992	One Long Argument: Charles Darwin and the Genesis of Modern Evolutionary Thought	Ernst W. Mayr	Biology
1991	Envisioning Information	Edward R. Tufte	Statistics
1990	Wonderful Life: The Burgess Shale and the Nature of History	Stephen Jay Gould	Biology
1989	The How and the Why: An Essay on the Origins and Development of Physical Theory	David Allen Park	Physics
1988	Infinite in All Directions	Freeman Dyson	Cosmology
1987	Chemicals and Society: A Guide to the New Chemical Age	Hugh D. Crone	Chemistry
1986	The Mystery of Comets	Fred L. Whipple	Astronomy
1985	The Scientific Reinterpretation of Form	Norma E. Emerton	Science
1984	Frozen Star: Of Pulsars, Black Holes and the Fate of Stars	George Greenstein	Astronomy
1983	Hen’s Teeth and Horse’s Toes: Further Reflections in Natural History	Stephen Jay Gould	Biology
1982	Emerging Cosmology: Convergence	Bernard Lovell	Cosmology
1981	Cosmic Dawn: The Origins of Matter and Life	Eric J. Chaisson	Cosmology
1980	The Image of Eternity: Roots of Time in the Physical World	David Allen Park	Physics
1979	Ice Ages: Solving the Mystery	John Imbrie and Katherine Palmer Imbrie	Climatology
1978	Mechanics of the Mind	Colin Blakemore	Medicine
1977	The High Frontier: Human Colonies in Space	Gerard K. O'Neill	Space colonization
1976	Beautiful Swimmers: Watermen, Crabs and the Chesapeake Bay	William W. Warner	Biology
1975	The Healing Hand: Man and Wound in the Ancient World	Guido Majno	Medicine
1974	Darwin on Man: A Psychological Study of Scientific Creativity	Howard E. Gruber, Paul H. Barrett	Biology
1973	The Computer from Pascal to von Neumann	Herman H. Goldstine	Computation
1972	The Closing Circle: Nature, Man and Technology	Barry Commoner	Sociology
1971	Vitamin C and the Common Cold	Linus Pauling	Medicine
1970	The Life and Death of a Salt Marsh	John Teal	Ecology
1969	Antibodies and Immunity	Gustav J. G. Nossal	Medicine
1968	Great Waters: A Voyage of Natural History to Study Whales, Plankton, and the Waters of the Southern Ocean	Alister Hardy	Biology
1967	Modern Genetics	Haig P. Papazian	Biology
1966	Man Adapting	René Dubos	Medicine
1965	Bird Migration	Donald R. Griffin	Biology
1964	The Origin of Adaptations	Verne Grant	Biology
1963	The Unseen World	René Dubos	Biology
1962	The World of Ice	James L. Dyson	Climatology
1961	Communication Among Social Bees	Martin Lindauer	Biology
1960	The Forest and the Sea	Marston Bates	Ecology
1959	Darwin’s Century: Evolution and the Men Who Discovered It	Loren Eiseley	Biology

== See also ==
- List of general science and technology awards
- Ralph Waldo Emerson Award
