= Life satisfaction =

Well-being measurement

Life satisfaction is an evaluation of a person's quality of life. It is assessed in terms of mood, relationship satisfaction, achieved goals, self-concepts, and the self-perceived ability to cope with life. Life satisfaction involves a favorable attitude towards life—rather than an assessment of current feelings. Life satisfaction has been measured in relation to economic standing, degree of education, experiences, residence, and other factors.

Life satisfaction is a key part of subjective well-being. Many factors influence subjective well-being and life satisfaction. Socio-demographic factors include gender, age, marital status, income, and education. Psychosocial factors include health, illness, functional ability, activity level, and social relationships. People tend to gain life satisfaction as they get older.

== Factors affecting life satisfaction ==
=== Personality ===
Meta-analyses using the Five Factor Model of Personality found that, among its "Big Five" personality traits, low neuroticism was the strongest predictor of life satisfaction, followed by high extraversion and conscientiousness. Other key factors include openness to experiences and socialization. Socially engaged people tend to be more satisfied with life.

Apart from the Five Factor model, a person's chronotype correlates with life satisfaction; morning-oriented people ("larks") showed higher life satisfaction than evening-oriented individuals ("owls").

An individual's genes affect their life satisfaction, so life satisfaction is partly heritable. One study found no significant differences between men and women in terms of the heritability of life satisfaction.

=== Self-esteem ===
Several studies have shown that self-esteem is a strong predictor of life satisfaction. Those with high levels of self-esteem are more likely to take a positive approach to dealing with day-to-day challenges and not be overwhelmed by them. Having higher self-esteem also leads to being more open about life and its opportunities. Those with diminished self-esteem tend to be more fearful, less social and hold a generally negative outlook.

=== Outlook on life ===
An individual's mood and outlook on life greatly influence their perception of their life satisfaction. Two correlating emotions that may influence how people perceive their lives are hope and optimism. Both of these emotions consist of cognitive processes that are usually oriented towards the perception and reaching of goals. Additionally, optimism is linked to higher life satisfaction, whereas pessimism is related to symptoms of depression.

According to Martin Seligman, the happier people are, the less they focus on the negative aspects of their lives. Happier people also have a greater tendency to like other people, which promotes a happier environment. This correlates to a higher level of the person's satisfaction with their life, due to the notion that constructiveness with others can positively influence life satisfaction. However, others have found that life satisfaction is compatible with profoundly negative emotional states like depression.

In a study carried out by Juan Pedro Serrano, José Miguel Latorre, Margaret Gatz, and Juan Montanes from the department of psychology at the Universidad de Castilla-La Mancha, researchers used life-review therapy with 43 older adults. The test they used was designed to measure participants' ability to recall a specific memory in response to a cue word while being timed. Thirty cue words, including five words classified as 'positive' (e.g., funny, lucky, passionate, happy, hopeful), five as 'negative' (unsuccessful, unhappy, sad, abandoned, gloomy), and five as 'neutral' (work, city, home, shoes, family), were presented orally in a fixed, alternating order to each member of a focus group. To ensure that the participants understood the instructions, examples were provided of both 'general' memories (e.g., summers in the city) and 'specific' memories (e.g., the day they got married). For each cue word, participants were asked to share a memory evoked by that word. The memory had to be of an event that should have occurred only once, at a particular time and place, and lasted no longer than a day. If the person could not recall a memory within 30 seconds, then that cue instance was not counted. Two psychologists served as raters and independently scored the responses of each participant. Each memory was tagged either as 'specific'—if the recalled event lasted no more than one day—or, otherwise, as 'general'. The raters were not informed regarding the hypotheses of the study, the experimental (control) group's membership, nor the content of the pretest or post-test. The results of this study showed that with an increased specificity of memories, individuals showed decreased depression and hopelessness, as well as increased life satisfaction.

=== Age ===
A common view is that age and life satisfaction have a "U-shape," with life satisfaction declining towards middle age, and then rising as people get older. Other scholars have found that there is no general age trend in life satisfaction, arguing that Blanchflower and Oswald's work is misguided for including inappropriate control variables (which cannot affect how old someone is).

The psychologists Yuval Palgi and Dov Shmotkin (2009) studied people who were primarily in their nineties. This subject group was found to have thought highly of their past and present. But generally, the group thought less of their future. These people were very satisfied with their lives up until the point they were surveyed but knew that their death was sooner to come (and so were not quite as hopeful for the future). Intelligence is also a factor because life satisfaction grows as people get older; as they grow older, they become wiser and more knowledgeable, so they begin to see that life will be better and understand the important things in life more.

On the other hand, a study finds that adolescents have a lower level of life satisfaction than their older counterparts. This could be because many decisions are imminent, and an adolescent could be facing them for the first time in their life. Although many adolescents have insecurities about many aspects of their lives, satisfaction with friends stayed at a consistent level. This is hypothetically attributed to the amount one can identify with those in one's age group over other age groups. In this same study, researchers found that satisfaction with family decreased. This could be because more rules and regulations are typically implemented by parental figures, and adolescents tend to demonize those in control of them. Additionally, the same study reports that life satisfaction in terms of sexuality increased. This is because at this age, many adolescents reach sexual maturation, which can encourage them to find verification and satisfaction in the idea of a sexual partnership.

=== Life events and experiences ===
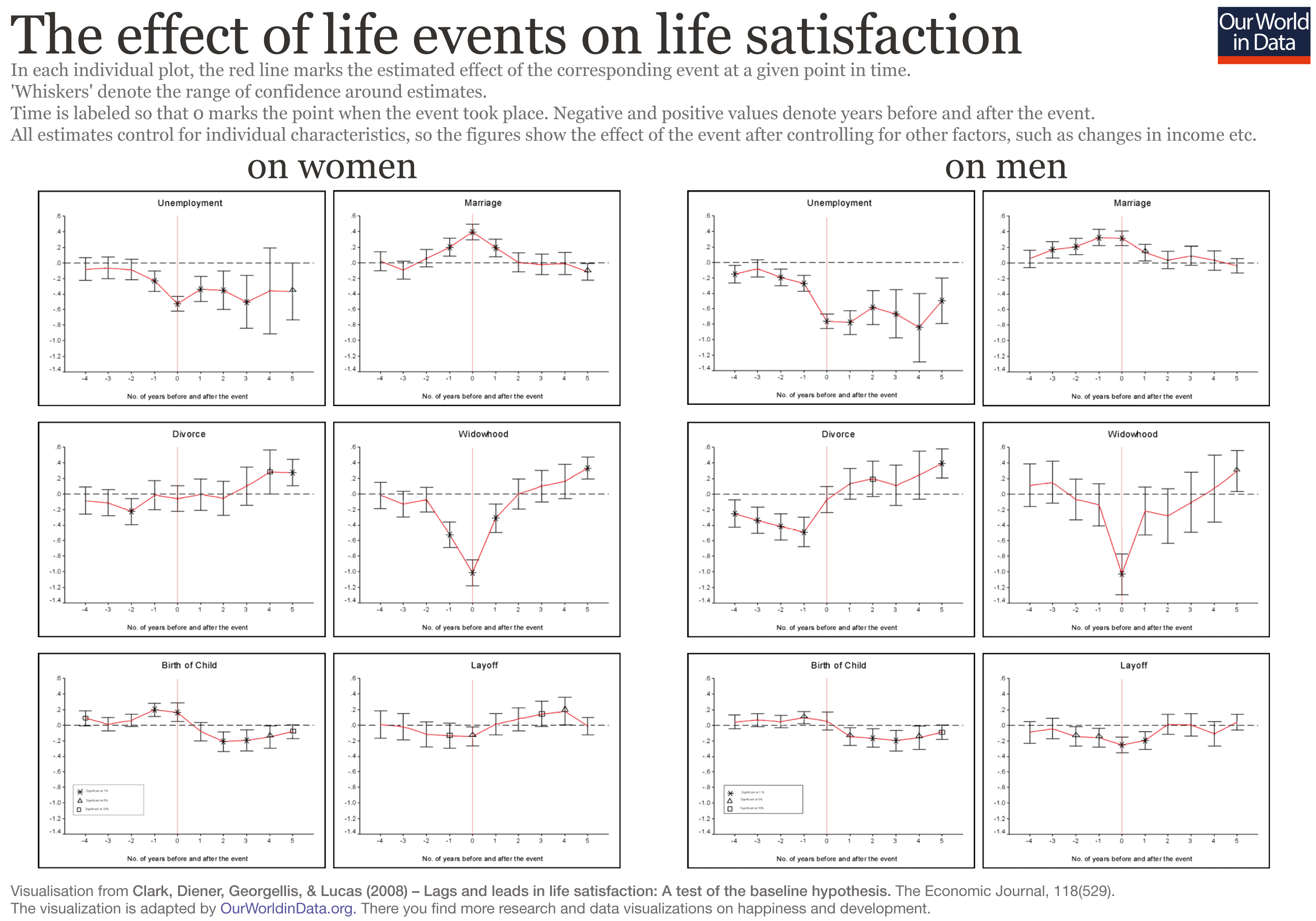
The effect of life events on life satisfaction. Single life events tend to affect happiness in the short run, but people often adapt to changes.

There are several factors that contribute to and influence self-reported levels of life satisfaction, including unique life events and experiences. These include both acute events (e.g., the death of a loved one) and chronic, daily experiences (e.g., ongoing family discord). In the book Happier: Learn the Secrets to Daily Joy and Lasting Fulfillment, Harvard lecturer Tal Ben-Shahar argues that happiness should be one's ultimate goal and the primary factor in evaluating alternative choices. As the subtitle implies, Happier recommends the pursuit of an immediate joyful experience in ways that contributes to more long-term, meaningful satisfaction. Ben-Shahar further argues that pursuing genuine self-motivated goals, rather than just instant pleasure or selflessness in service of long-delayed enjoyment, results in an optimal combination of short- and long-term happiness.

Life experiences significantly effect a person's view of their external environment. There are several influences this can have on their world view, both generally and more specifically, such as the way they interact with others, the way they behave, and the way they view the world around them—all of which affect their life satisfaction. Someone who tends to see the world in a more negative light may have a completely different level of satisfaction than someone who is constantly admiring the beauty of their surroundings. People who are engaged with more stress on average can contribute to higher levels of self-report life satisfaction as long as they understand how to deal with their stress positively.

Recent research in the hospitality industry has found that the COVID-19 pandemic heightened already existing occupational stress who believe they might come in contact with the virus. The pandemic also increased their absenteeism to avoid potential interactions and avoid infections.

=== Seasonal effects ===
A recent study analyzes time-dependent rhythms in happiness, comparing life satisfaction by weekdays (weekend neurosis), days of the month (negative effects towards the end of the month), and year with gender and education and outlining the differences observed. Primarily within the winter months of the year, an onset of depression can affect one, called seasonal affective disorder (SAD). It is recurrent, beginning in the fall or winter months and remitting in the spring or summer. It is said that those who experience this disorder usually have a history of major depressive or bipolar disorder, which may be hereditary, having a family member affected as well.

Seasonal affective disorder is hypothesized to be caused by diminishing exposure to environmental light, which can lead to changes in levels of the neurotransmitter chemical serotonin. Diminishing active serotonin levels increases depressive symptoms. There are currently a few treatment therapies in order to help with seasonal affective disorder. The first line of therapy is light therapy. Light therapy involves exposure to bright, fluorescent lighting that acts to mimic outdoor light, counteracting the presumed effects of SAD. Due to the shifts in neurochemical levels, antidepressants are another form of therapy. Other than light therapy and antidepressants, there are several alternatives that involve agomelatine, melatonin, psychological interventions, as well as diet and lifestyle changes.

Research has found that the onset of SAD typically occurs between the ages of 20 and 30 years, but most affected people do not seek medical help. This could be due to the stigma of mental health issues. Many are afraid to state they are suffering and would rather hide it. This suggests that more education and acceptance might be needed to solve these issues.

=== Values ===
It is proposed that overall life satisfaction comes from within an individual based on the individual's values—associated with better physical health, higher performance, and stronger social relationships. Satisfaction with life is paramount for a person's well-being. For some, it is family, for others, it is love, and for others, it may be money or other material items; either way, it varies from one person to another. Economic materialism can be considered a value. Previous research found that materialistic individuals were predominantly male and that materialistic people also reported a lower life satisfaction level than their non-materialistic counterparts. The same is true of people who value money over helping other people; this is because the money they have can buy them the assets they deem valuable. Materialistic people are less satisfied with life because they constantly want more and more belongings, and once those belongings are obtained, they lose value, which in turn causes these people to want more belongings, and the cycle continues. If these materialistic individuals do not have enough money to satisfy their cravings for more items, they become more dissatisfied. This has been referred to as a hedonic treadmill. Individuals reporting a high value on traditions and religion reported a higher level of life satisfaction. This is also true for reported routine churchgoers and people who pray frequently. Other individuals that reported higher levels of life satisfaction were people who valued creativity and people who valued respect for and from others—two more qualities seemingly not related to material goods. Because hard times come around and people often count on their peers and family to help them through, it is no surprise that a higher life satisfaction level was reported in people who had social support, whether it be friends, family, or church. People who personally valued material items were found to be less satisfied overall in life as opposed to people who attached a higher amount of value in interpersonal relationships. In accordance with the findings above, the notion of self-value plays a part in how someone regards their own life. People who take pride in themselves by staying mentally and physically fit have higher levels of life satisfaction purely due to the content of their day. These values come together in determining how somebody sees themselves in light of others.

=== Culture ===
Defining culture by reference to deeply engrained societal values and beliefs. Culture affects the subjective well-being. Well-being includes both general life satisfaction, and the relative balance of positive affect versus negative affect in daily life. Culture directs the attention to different sources of information for making life satisfaction judgments, thus affecting subjective well-being appraisal.

Individualistic cultures direct attention to inner states and feelings (such as positive or negative effects), while in collectivistic cultures the attention is directed to outer sources (i.e., adhering to social norms or fulfilling one's duties). Indeed, Suh et al. (1998) found that the correlation between life satisfaction and the prevalence of positive effects is higher in individualistic cultures, whereas in collectivistic cultures affect and adhering to norms are equally important for life satisfaction. Most modern western societies, such as the US and European countries, tend towards individualism, while eastern societies like China and Japan, are directed towards collectivism. Collectivistic cultures emphasize family and social unity. They put others' needs before their individual desires. An individualistic culture is geared towards one's own personal achievements and involves a strong sense of competition. People are expected to carry their own weight and rely on themselves. The United States is said to be one of the most individualistic countries, while Korea and Japan on the other hand are some of the most collectivistic countries. However, both have their flaws. An individualistic approach can lead to loneliness, while those in a collectivist culture may be prone to having a fear of rejection (see also social control for more).

=== Family ===
A contributing influence to life satisfaction is that of family life and household circumstances. Family life satisfaction is a pertinent topic as everyone's family influences them in some way and most strive to have high levels of satisfaction in life as well as within their own family. Family life satisfaction has been shown in studies to be enhanced by the ability of family members to jointly realize their family-related values in behavior. It is important to examine family life satisfaction from all members of the family from a "perceived" perspective and an "ideal" perspective. Greater life satisfaction within a family increases through communication and understanding each members' attitudes and perceptions. The family can make a significant contribution to an individual's life satisfaction.

In an article by Carolyn S. Henry, adolescent life satisfaction has very different origins from the life satisfaction of adults. An adolescent's life satisfaction is heavily influenced by their family's dynamics and characteristics. Family bonding, family flexibility, and parental support are all huge factors in the adolescent's life satisfaction. The more bonding, flexibility, and support there is within a family the higher the adolescent's life satisfaction. Results of this study also revealed that adolescents living in a single-parent family home had significantly lower life satisfaction than that of adolescents in a two-parent home. An adolescent's age is extremely important in terms of life satisfaction coming from their family.

In a research study by Pollmann-Schult (2014) on 13,093 Germans, it was found that when finances and time costs are held constant, parents are happier and show increased life satisfaction than non-parents. The researchers noted that their study is culture and context specific and may not generalize to other countries.

Life satisfaction is also affected by parenthood and couples introducing children into their relationships. Research done by McLanahan & Adams (1987) provides evidence that adults with children can be less happy due to less life satisfaction, less marital satisfaction, more anxiety, and more depression.

=== Marriage ===
Marriage appears to have a positive correlation with life satisfaction, but the causality is still under debate. Many studies do not consider whether self-selection could be a factor affecting the relationship between marriage and life satisfaction. There is evidence to suggest that happier individuals are more likely to marry, which means that part of the reason for the positive correlation is that people select into marriage. People who are perceived as happy may be more likely to attract a marital partner, as happiness can be an attractive personality trait. In addition, even if there is a causation effect such that marriage causes higher life satisfaction, social exclusion and stigma experienced by single individuals may be those responsible for higher levels of life satisfaction among married couples, rather than marriage itself.

In cultures where arranged marriages are common, studies comparing arranged and non-arranged marriages show no significant differences in life satisfaction. This applies to comparisons between different groups in the same culture, as well as between groups in different countries with differing views on arranged marriages.

=== Education ===
Some research has suggested that those who gain higher levels of education also experience higher levels of life satisfaction. This could be because those who graduate from college and have higher education levels report working in fields and positions that are more meaningful, engaging, and secure than their lesser educated counterparts. Consequently, those who are employed in more secure and meaningful jobs are more likely to report achieving success.

=== Career ===
A satisfying career is an important component of life satisfaction. Doing something meaningful in a productive capacity contributes to life satisfaction. This notion of accomplishment is related to a person's drive. The need for accomplishment is an essential part of becoming a fully functional person, and when someone feels accomplished in their career status they are more likely to be optimistic about their life and future; thus improving their life satisfaction.

Research has shown that career satisfaction and life satisfaction are uniquely correlated with each other and that as career satisfaction increases, so does life satisfaction. In a longitudinal study completed at the Department of Psychology and Sports Science at Universitaet Erlangen-Neurnberg, they followed 1200 individuals who graduated with master's degrees at different German Universities. Participants were given a survey after their final exam in 1999, and then received further surveys in the years 2001, 2004, 2008, and 2011. The results of this study concluded that there is a correlation between career satisfaction and life satisfaction. Specifically the researchers found that "a person with high life satisfaction will also experience his or her career and work more positively than a person with lower life satisfaction."

Having more money is not directly correlated to more happiness. It has also been found that the money owned is correlated with satisfaction rather than the amount of money made. Saving money and using it on valuable experiences has been found to be better than spending on material items.

=== Social narratives ===
Daniel Kahneman has said that “life satisfaction is connected to a large degree to social yardsticks–achieving goals, meeting expectations.” Building on this view, Paul Dolan suggests that social yardsticks are an integral part of ‘social narratives’, defined as ‘meta-social preferences’, where people in general consciously or unconsciously thrive to fulfill. A classic example of social narrative would be: “getting married and having kids is essential for a female to be happy and fulfilled”. From an evolutionary perspective, such inclination most likely stems from a strong innate drive of culture-learning, whereby evolution has denoted trusting and relying on community information over personal experience. While the ‘addiction to culture’ is shown to be an evolutionarily successful strategy, pursuing social narratives has mixed results in achieving happiness and life satisfaction in modern society. Overall, focusing too much on reaching social narratives may deviate people from engaging in what actually elevates their life satisfaction level. This is called “a narrative trap.”

==== Systematic errors towards a narrative trap ====
Research had found clear discrepancies between experienced utility (i.e.. Hedonic experience related to an outcome) to decision utility (i.e.. Wantability inferred from choices) whereby the former is subject to the systematic influence of peak-end effect and duration neglect and is most frequently used to direct decision-making. Validating this view, cold-hand experiment shows that people overwhelmingly prefer to have their hands in freezing water for 90 seconds with a slight increase in temperature (thus improved experience at the end) than to have their hands in for 60 seconds without an increase in temperature in the end, implying that a decision is not aligned with experience. Questions on measuring life satisfaction are predominantly answered by the “Remembering self” (i.e., How was it, overall?) reflected on experienced utility, with respect to a subjective evaluation of what accounts for a good life. Therefore, despite having a strong preference for longer periods of happiness, there are systematic errors that divert people from engaging in coherent and consistent behavior, and in reflecting on their life-satisfaction level. This is fundamental to a narrative trap where the neglection effect undermines experience in its contribution towards well-being, while socially salient narratives drive decision and behavior.

Researchers had agreed on the importance that attention plays in determining one's emotional state. It is suggested that inputs' impact on output, such as life satisfaction, is mediated by the amount of attention being allocated upon input. Happiness is felt on things that people pay attention to, yet it is claimed that “nothing in life is as important as you think it is when you are thinking about it”, which is referred to as focusing illusion. For example, research had found that income has a greater impact on life satisfaction for those who see the high-financial status as essential than those who do not. Further, people who reached their goal of achieving high earnings are on average more satisfied than those who failed to reach their expectations. There is a limited amount of attention, and its allocation is fundamental in determining overall happiness.

Incorporated under the umbrella term “Affective forecasting”, it is argued that having attention problems such as mistaken beliefs and projections, whereby one can make systematic errors in perceiving the reality and predicting the future's influence, creates the fundamental vulnerability to falling into narrative traps. In terms of mistaken projection, apart from 1) peak-end effect, and 2) focusing illusion, there are other types: 3) distinction bias (focus on dissimilarities of two choices yet fell to take into consideration of the experience after the decision is made); 4) Impact bias (the tendency for people to overestimate the length or the intensity of future feeling states). Lying at the core of mistaken belief is sense of volition (i.e. having freewill), acting on mechanisms such as fundamental attributional bias (where one judges others' motives as external while theirs as internal), confirmation bias (which in itself is a form of narrative-reaching), and cognitive dissonance. In contrast, it was argued that instead of willpower, genes, context, and luck plays a much larger role in explaining behavior.

==== Components of narrative traps ====
Fulfilling the social narratives is regarded as having a key influence on happiness, defined by Paul Dolan as ‘a flow of pleasure and purpose over time’. This implies that rather than allowing the natural tendency where the “Remembering self” to makes the most of a happiness decision, by recognizing and accepting social narrative traps relevant to self, people are better able to regulate their attention, thereby improving satisfaction at “Experiencing self” as well. Three major narrative traps are identified: 1) reaching (more happiness is achieved with greater income, a marker of success and intellectual validation), 2) related (people ought to have a monogamous marriage and have kids), and 3) responsible (to act altruistically with a pure selfless motive; to prioritize good health and to act with free will to be held accountable). Validating narrative traps' effect on life satisfaction, it has been found that factors such as income and education attainment explain satisfaction in relative terms. For example, it was found that despite being more educated in absolute terms, people were less satisfied if others around them improves education more. This implies that the contribution of more traditionally researched factors of life satisfaction (i.e. Income, employment, education, relationships) could be mediated by the extent of social narrative fulfillment.

== Relationship with subjective well-being ==
Life satisfaction is one component of subjective well-being, along with affective balance.

== See also ==
Indices

- Broad measures of economic progress
- Disability-adjusted life year
- Full cost accounting
- Gender-related Development Index
- Genuine Progress Indicator (GPI)
- Global Peace Index
- Green gross domestic product (Green GDP)
- Green national product
- Gross National Happiness
- Gross National Well-being (GNW)
- Happiness economics
- Happy Planet Index (HPI)
- Human Development Index (HDI)
- ISEW (Index of sustainable economic welfare)
- Legatum Prosperity Index
- Leisure satisfaction
- Living planet index
- OECD Better Life Index
- Satisfaction with Life Index
- Sustainable Development Goals (SDG)
- Where-to-be-born Index
- Wikiprogress
- World Happiness Report (WHR)
- World Values Survey (WVS)

Other

- Decent work
- Democracy Ranking
- Demographic economics
- Economics
- Economic development
- Eudaimonia
- Ethics of care
- Human Development and Capability Association
- Human Poverty Index
- Job satisfaction
- Life stance
- Lived experience
- Progress (history)
- Progressive utilization theory
- Post-materialism
- Psychometrics
- International Association for Feminist Economics
- International development
- Self-fulfillment
- Sustainable development
- System of National Accounts
- Tripartite model of subjective well-being
- Welfare economics
