= Douglas Emlen =

Evolutionary biologist and academic

- Born: April 29, 1967
- Education: Cornell University (B.A.), Princeton University (Ph.D.)
- Awards: Presidential Early Career Award for Scientists and Engineers, American Academy of Arts and Sciences (2016)
- Scientific career
- Workplaces: University of Montana
- Website: www.emlen-lab.org

Douglas Emlen (born April 29, 1967) is an evolutionary biologist and Professor of Biology at the University of Montana. Emlen was inducted into the National Academy of Sciences in 2023.

Emlen's research provides insights into the development and evolution of exaggerated male weaponry, such as the horns found in scarab beetles. His work combines approaches from behavioral ecology, genetics, phylogenetics, and developmental biology to understand how evolution has shaped these structures. His projects include an examination of how altered expression of appendage patterning genes contributes to species differences in the shape of horns, and how the insulin receptor (InR) pathway modulates the size of male weapons in response to the larval nutritional environment.

Emlen and his work were featured in documentaries for the BBC (Nature’s Wildest Weapons) and NOVA (Extreme Animal Weapons), and released his first narrative nonfiction book for middle school readers, Beetle Battles: One Scientist’s Journey of Adventure and Discovery in December 2019. He is the grandson of John T. Emlen.

== Education ==
Emlen received a B.A. from Cornell University in 1989, and a Ph.D. from Princeton University in 1994.

== Selected awards and honors ==
- American Academy of Arts and Sciences (2016)
- Phi Beta Kappa Award in Science (2015, for Animal Weapons)
- E. O. Wilson Naturalist Award, The American Society of Naturalists (2013)
- Golden Key Honor Society (2012)
- Elected to the council, Society for the Study of Evolution (2007-2009)
- Presidential Early Career Award for Scientists and Engineers, Office of Science and Technology Policy, Executive Office of the President, Washington, D.C. 2002
- American Naturalists Young Investigator Prize (1997)

== Bibliography ==
- Evolution: Making Sense of Life (2012), co-authored with Carl Zimmer. ISBN 1-936-22117-9
- Animal Weapons: The Evolution of Battle (2014). ISBN 978-0-8050-9450-3
- Beetle Battles: One One Scientist’s Journey of Adventure and Discovery ISBN 978-1-2501-4711-0
