= Olivier Sibony =

French author

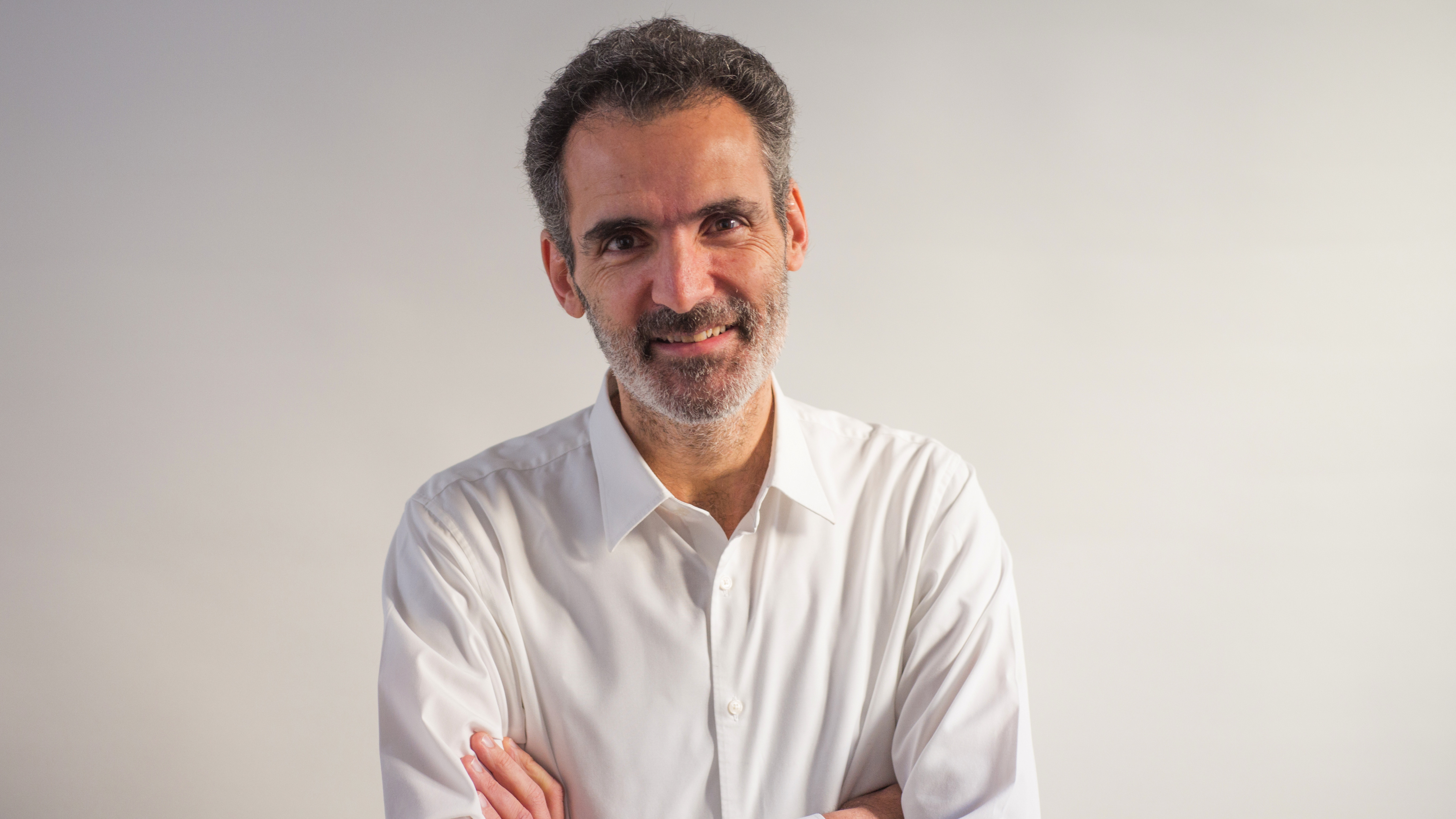
- Born: 1967 (age 58–59); Paris, France
- Citizenship: French
- Education: HEC Paris
- Scientific career
- Fields: Business, Economics
- Workplaces: McKinsey & Company, HEC Paris
- Website: oliviersibony.com

Olivier Sibony (born 1967) is a French academic and author known for his research on behavioral strategy and for his work on the impact of heuristics and biases on strategic decision-making and procedures to enhance the quality of decisions. He is the author of several popular books and the co-author of the New York Times best-seller Noise: A Flaw in Human Judgment, with Daniel Kahneman and Cass R. Sunstein.

Sibony is a professor of strategy and management at HEC Paris, where he received the Vernimmen Prize for teaching excellence in 2020. He is also affiliated with Saïd Business School at Oxford University as an Associate Fellow.

== Early life and education ==
Olivier Sibony was born in 1967 in Paris, France. After his Baccalauréat at Lycée Louis-Le-Grand and classes préparatoires at Lycée Carnot, he attended HEC Paris, graduating in 1988.

In 2017, Sibony defended his Ph.D. thesis at Université Paris Dauphine under the supervision of Professor Stéphanie Dameron. His topic was "Understanding and preventing error in strategic decision processes: the contribution of behavioral strategy".

== Career ==
From 1991 to 2015, Olivier Sibony worked at McKinsey & Company, where he was elected partner in 1997 and senior partner in 2004.

In 2015, Sibony joined the faculty of HEC Paris where he is currently Professor (Education Track) in the Strategy department. Sibony is also an Associate Fellow of Said Business School at Oxford University.

Since 2017, Sibony holds the title of Knight in the Legion of Honor, one of the highest French awards for contributions to French society.

In 2026, Sibony and Eric Hazan received the Émile Girardeau Prize from the Académie des sciences morales et politiques for their book Faut-il encore décider ?.

== Research ==
Sibony's research interests center on applying insights from judgment and decision-making to business strategy, a field he was among the first to name "Behavioral Strategy." He has written extensively about the effect of cognitive biases on strategic decisions and explored ways to identify and mitigate biases.

Throughout his work, Sibony emphasizes the danger of letting cognitive biases affect strategic decisions and the importance of procedures to protect them. In his early work You’re about to make a terrible mistake, he proposes the concept of decision architecture as a way to deliberately design decision processes in order to reduce their vulnerability to cognitive biases. In his later publications, he advocates decision hygiene—a set of techniques aimed at reducing both bias and noise, the unwanted and unpredictable variability of judgments. Sibony recommends shifting from intuitive to deliberate processes by using checklists, premortems, and formal decision protocols. He also proposes the use of noise audits and independent assessments to avoid relying solely on the judgment of individual experts. Sibony argues that organizations should design their decision processes with the same rigor they apply to operations or finance, embedding discipline and accountability into strategic choices. He has written numerous articles and case studies on these topics, which have been published in leading business publications such as Harvard Business Review, Sloan Management Review, California Management Review, and McKinsey Quarterly.

Since 2025, Sibony has contributed to the discourse on corporate diversity by challenging common assumptions about its benefits and about the role cognitive biases play in the lack of diversity. Rather than focusing solely on demographic representation, Sibony emphasizes the importance of cognitive diversity the inclusion of individuals with differing mental models and problem-solving approaches as a driver of better decision-making.

He critiques the instrumentalist rhetoric that portrays diversity as automatically enhancing performance, arguing instead that without deliberate design and friction management, diverse teams can underperform, and that the ethical rationale for diversity and inclusion should be sufficient. While recognizing the prevalence of stereotypes and the value of setting quantitative targets, he draws on behavioral science to advocate for structured decision processes that mitigate conformity pressures and enable dissenting views to surface productively. His work seeks to reconcile the goals of inclusion and organizational effectiveness, proposing evidence-based frameworks for selecting, integrating, and leading cognitively diverse teams.

== Selected publications ==
=== Books ===
- Hazan, Eric; Sibony Olivier (2025). Faut-il encore décider ?. Paris: Flammarion. ISBN 978-2-08-014668-7.
- Sibony, Olivier (2025). La diversité n'est pas ce que vous croyez ! idées reçues, impasses et comment en sortir. Paris: Flammarion. ISBN 978-2-08-045305-1.
- Moreau, Anne-Sophie; Demurger, Pascal; Sibony, Olivier (2025-03-10). Tout demander à l'entreprise ? (in French). Philo Editions. ISBN 978-2-487699-08-3.
- Kahneman, D., Sibony, O. & Sunstein, C. (2021). Noise. A Flaw in Human Judgement. New York: Little Brown Spark.
- Sibony, O. (2020). You're About to Make a Terrible Mistake: How Biases Distort Decision-Making and What You Can Do to Fight Them. New York: Little, Brown Spark. ISBN 978-1-80075-001-2.
- Garrette, Bernard; Phelps, Corey; Sibony, Olivier (2018), "The Most Important Skill You Never Learned", Cracked it!, Cham: Springer International Publishing, pp. 1–14, doi:10.1007/978-3-319-89375-4_1, ISBN 978-3-319-89374-7
- French : (2021) Trouvez-moi la solution ! Les méthodes de résolution de problèmes des meilleurs consultants en stratégie. Paris : Flammarion (Clés des Champs).
- Sibony, O. (2020). Vous allez redécouvrir le management ! 40 clés scientifiques pour prendre de meilleures décisions. Paris : Flammarion.
- Garrette, B., Lehmann-Ortega, L., Leroy, F., Dussauge. P., Durand, R., Pointeau, B. & Sibony, O. (2019). STRATEGOR. Toute la stratégie de la start-up à la multinationale (Livres en Or, 8th ed)

=== Articles in popular press ===
- Kahneman, D., Sibony, O. & Sunstein, C. (18 May 2021). For a Fairer World, It's Necessary First to Cut Through the ‘Noise’. New York Times.
- Sibony, O. (25 April 2020). « Experts, décideurs ou simples observateurs, nous sommes tous affectés par des biais cognitifs ». Le Monde.
- Sibony, O. (19 March 2020, mise à jour 20 April 2020). Comment avons-nous pu nous aveugler à ce point ? Ces bias qui ont retardé la prise de conscience face au virus. Philonomist.
