= Dov Shmotkin =

Israeli psychologist (born 1949)

Dov Shmotkin (Hebrew: דב שמוטקין; born 1949) is professor emeritus in the School of Psychological Sciences and former head of the Herczeg Institute on Aging, both at Tel Aviv University.

== Biography ==
Dov Shmotkin was born in 1949 in Rishon Le-Zion, Israel. He is professor emeritus in the School of Psychological Sciences and former head of the Herczeg Institute on Aging, both at Tel Aviv University, where he received his PhD. He is a senior clinical psychologist and was formerly head of the clinical psychology graduate program in the School of Psychological Sciences. Shmotkin was visiting scholar in the Institute of Gerontology at the University of Michigan (1988–89) and honorary fellow in the Institute on Aging at the University of Wisconsin (1996–97). He served as senior researcher in the Cross-Sectional and Longitudinal Aging Study (CALAS) and Israeli branch of the Survey of Health, Ageing and Retirement in Europe (SHARE-Israel), surveys on Israel's older population. He directed a project which combined databases from these studies with others on Israel's aging populations. Shmotkin was appointed Fellow of the Gerontological Society of America.

== Research ==
Shmotkin's scientific work focused on a dialectical approach to human happiness and suffering, primarily on adulthood and old age. His works explore psychological mechanisms through which people maintain well-being and resilience against adversity and aging processes inflicting trauma, decline and loss. In his conceptual model, The Pursuit of Happiness in a Hostile World, Shmotkin, and his associates, developed a dynamic framework on the relationship between resilience and vulnerability. His work in gerontology addressed combatting disintegration in later life through wellness, adaptational functioning and self-fulfillment. A recurring theme across his works is the study of the relationship between well-being and distress.

Shmotkin's was included in 100 top international experts in positive psychology, presented in The World Book of Happiness. Elsevier and Stanford University included him in the top 2% most impactful scientists within gerontology based on his 2022 c-score. He was ranked within the top 0.5% of scholars for his research on subjective well-being, life satisfaction, and well-being by ScholarGPS in 2022.

=== The pursuit of happiness in a hostile world ===
Happiness is achieved through two major systems: subjective well-being and meaning in life. While most approaches regard happiness as a mental outcome, Shmotkin's model considers it a process; both subjective well-being and meaning in life systems regulate personal conceptions of hostile-world scenarios. The model's concept of hostile-world scenario focuses on self-beliefs about disasters and inflictions, and is central to the image each individual has on their physical and mental integrity. For most people, the hostile-world scenario is an adaptive mechanism for scanning adverse conditions in life. When under-activated, it may induce reckless behavior, and when over-activated, it may produce a sense of constant danger. Research has shown that reactions to hostile-world scenarios can influence the relationship between the scenario and mental health outcomes. The concept of hostile-world scenario exposed derivative themes, such as perceived threats of evil in individuals with traumatic backgrounds.

The model centers on the constant interaction between happiness-promoting systems and the hostile-world scenario. The pursuit of happiness allows individuals to function competently despite the presence of hostile-world scenarios. In threatening conditions, the happiness-promoting systems may amplify or compensate for each other. Non-resilient mechanisms are possible when hostile-world scenarios involve increased depletion and vulnerability.

=== The multiple appearances of happiness ===
Shmotkin's work explained multiple modules and configurations of happiness. For example, different combinations of aspects of subjective well-being (for example, life satisfaction and positive affect) created different types of well-being among individuals. Some of these types had imbalanced aspects, such as high life satisfaction and low positive affect. The studies observed individuals' subjective well-being in the past, present, and future, which allowed examination of how the individual's well-being evolved across their life. He investigated how people compare their well-being to anchor periods, paramount experiences in one's remembered past. The studies showed that people formed an emotional matrix of happiness and suffering of their past experiences. These reflected congruent and incongruent feelings associated with current subjective well-being, reactions to trauma, and coping with aging. These modules, within one's subjective well-being and in combination with meaning in life, provide many methods to cope with adversity.

Shmotkin advocated for the use of person-centered methods, rather than variable-centered methods, to describe subconscious function and well-being. This helped to contrast individuals who maintained congruity with related variables and those who did not. Incongruent relations may indicate conflicting or ambivalent inclination or encompass adaptational advantages; this aligns with Shmotkin's view that resilience and vulnerability, in disadvantageous conditions, coexist.

=== Holocaust survivors and long-term effects of trauma ===
Holocaust survivors act as a model of how extreme trauma in early life has impacts into old age. Under Shmotkin's approach, their trauma is an example of the interaction of happiness-promoting systems and intensified hostile-world scenarios. By studying Holocaust survivors in an array of community and national samples, Shmotkin and his colleagues concluded that older survivors usually manifested general resilience with specific vulnerabilities in pertinent psychosocial issues. Coping with the trauma was controlled by how survivors mentally framed their traumatization in time and their ability to incorporate the trauma into their life story. In reviews of research on Holocaust survivors, Shmotkin explained the interactions between long-term effects of the trauma with aging processes and family constellation.

To improve his methodology in his Holocaust survivor studies, Shmotkin carefully considered his focal and comparison groups. The question "Who is a survivor?" proved complex, and was approached by combining subjective and objective criteria. It was detailed that the precedent of a single comparison group in past studies on survivors was not methodologically suitable; several different groups were required for instructive comparison with the survivors' grouping.

Shmotkin examined long-term traumatic effects through SHARE-Israel. Alongside collaborators, he described cumulative adversity, which characterized stressful experiences along the lives of older people; he differentiated these into self-oriented, where the primary harm was to oneself, and other-oriented, where the primary harm was to someone else, to describe all potentially traumatic events. The team found that cumulative adversity, particularly self-oriented, was detrimental to physical and mental functioning.

=== Gerontological research ===
Shmotkin's view extends into his gerontological work, where aging reflects the interaction between resilience and vulnerability, and survival and mortality. His work focuses on epidemiological national surveys—mainly CALAS and SHARE-Israel—where he juxtaposed physical and mental health; while physical health was an increasingly dominant factor in mortality in old age, certain psychosocial factors remained significant.

Another focus point of Shmotkin's gerontological work was the role of individuals' time perspective in understanding their later life. At old age, people usually preserve high levels of happiness, even following harsh adversity in the past. Shmotkin's studies showed that older people organised positive and negative feelings from their past and buffered fears about their future; notions of time perspective appeared embedded in people's adjustment to aging.

Shmotkin studied scarcely examined aging-related issues. For example, he looked at the challenges of fatherhood and aging among gay and heterosexual men, particularly examining the vulnerability of gay men who were children of Holocaust survivors. These also included the continuity of adult's bonds with their deceased parents, the inconsistency between objective and subjective indicators of one's memory in old age, the disconnect between physical and mental health in very old age, and the impact of the death of a child among aged parents.
