= Guido Majno =

Italian-born American medical writer

Guido Majno was an Italian-born American physician who served as a chairman of Department of Pathology at the University of Massachusetts Medical School, Worcester.

Majno, the grandson of the lawyer Luigi Majno, was born and raised in Milan, Italy. In 1947, he completed his doctorate degree from the University of Milan School of Medicine in medicine and surgery. After receiving his education, he started his career with University of Geneva’s Institute of Pathology.

In 1952, he moved to the United States and started working at Tufts University School of Medicine.

In 1953, he joined Harvard Medical School as an instructor.

In 1975, he published his book The Healing Hand: Man and Wound in the Ancient World which was reviewed by notable medical journals.

In 1999, he received Humanism in Medicine Award.

In 2010, he died at the age of 88.

A June 4, 1982 article on Majno in JAMA (Journal of the American Medical Association) provides more extensive background and a description of Dr. Majno's research for The Healing Hand: Man and Wound in the Ancient World.

== Books ==
- The Healing Hand: Man and Wound in the Ancient World (1975)
- Cells, Tissues, and Disease — Principles of General Pathology
