= Focusing illusion =

Form of cognitive bias

The focusing illusion is a cognitive bias where individuals overestimate the impact of a specific factor on their overall happiness. This leads people to believe that changes such as a promotion, an increase in income, or moving to a more desirable location will significantly improve their well-being. However, this bias causes them to neglect the influence of other, equally important factors that contribute to happiness, such as social relationships or daily routines. The concept was introduced by Daniel Kahneman and David Schkade in their 1998 study, which found that individuals overestimated the effect of living in California on their life satisfaction compared to other states.. Compared to the impact bias, which is more overall, the focusing illusion zeroes in on one factor of buying a car, a house, etc, and looks at how you are going to feel about that

== Evidence ==
Several studies provide evidence for the focusing illusion across different life domains. One example comes from the work of Wilson and Gilbert, who demonstrated that people often overestimate the emotional impact of future events. For instance, students predicting their happiness after a football game consistently exaggerated the long-term effects of either winning or losing.

In another experiment, Kahneman and colleagues tested how individuals predicted their well-being in various life circumstances, such as earning different levels of income. Their findings revealed that people generally overestimated how much their happiness would improve with higher income. Moreover, studies on affective forecasting have repeatedly shown that people tend to overestimate both the intensity and duration of emotional reactions to future life events, such as achieving career goals or purchasing material goods.

== Explanations ==
The focusing illusion is an affective forecasting errors, where individuals misjudge the emotional impact of future events, often overestimating how long feelings of joy or disappointment will last.

Robson and Samuelson proposed an evolutionary explanation for the focusing illusion. They argue that it is a feature of human cognition designed to keep people motivated. By focusing on potential future rewards, individuals are driven to pursue their goals, even though they may eventually habituate to these rewards. The illusion that happiness will increase with success keeps individuals striving for improvement.
