= Daniel Kahneman =

Israeli-American psychologist and economist (1934–2024)

- דניאל כהנמן
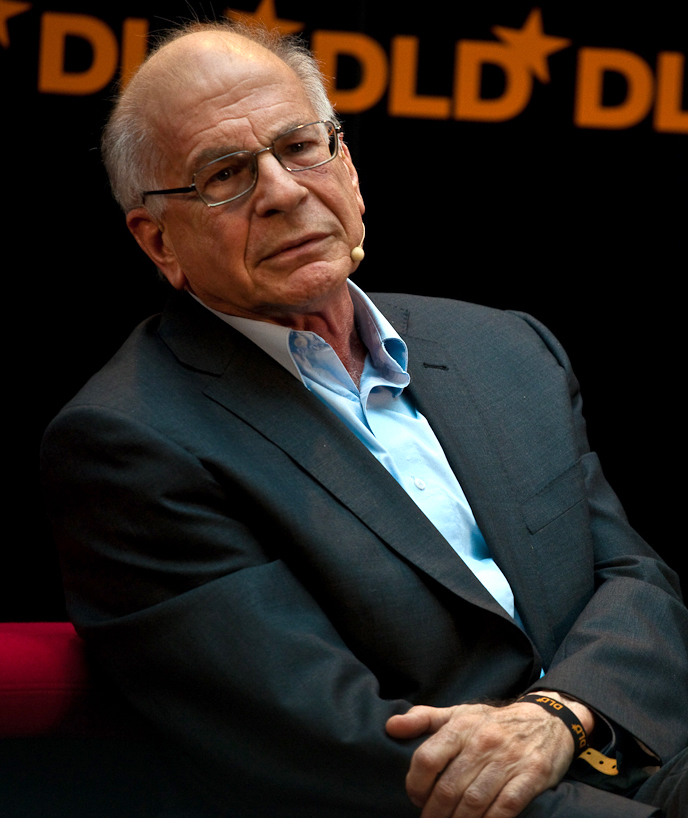
- Kahneman in 2009
- Born: March 5, 1934; British Mandate of Palestine
- Died: March 27, 2024 (aged 90); Nunningen, Switzerland
- Citizenship: American, Israeli
- Education: Hebrew University (BA); University of California, Berkeley (MA, PhD)
- Known for: Cognitive biases; Behavioral economics; Prospect theory; Loss aversion; Hedonic psychology
- Spouses: Irah Kahneman; Anne Treisman (m. 1978; died 2018)
- Partner: Barbara Tversky (2020–2024)
- Awards: APA Distinguished Scientific Contribution Award (1982); Nobel Memorial Prize in Economic Sciences (2002); University of Louisville Grawemeyer Award (2003); APA Lifetime Achievement Award (2007); Presidential Medal of Freedom (2013)
- Scientific career
- Fields: Psychology; Economics
- Workplaces: Princeton University (1993–2024); University of California, Berkeley (1986–93); University of British Columbia (1978–86); Center for Advanced Study in the Behavioral Sciences, Stanford (1972–73); Hebrew University of Jerusalem (1961–77)
- Thesis: An analytical model of the semantic differential (1961)
- Doctoral advisor: Susan M. Ervin-Tripp
- Notable students: Anat Ninio; Avishai Henik; Baruch Fischhoff; Ziv Carmon
- Daniel Kahneman's voice Recorded August 2013 from the BBC Radio 4 programme Desert Island Discs
- Website: scholar.princeton.edu/kahneman/

Daniel Kahneman (/ˈkɑːnəmən/; Hebrew: דניאל כהנמן; March 5, 1934 – March 27, 2024) was an Israeli-American psychologist best known for his work on the psychology of judgment and decision-making as well as behavioral economics, for which he was awarded the 2002 Nobel Memorial Prize in Economic Sciences together with Vernon L. Smith. Kahneman's published empirical findings challenge the assumption of human rationality prevailing in modern economic theory. Kahneman became known as the "grandfather of behavioral economics."

With Amos Tversky and others, Kahneman established a cognitive basis for common human errors that arise from heuristics and biases, and developed prospect theory. In 2011, Kahneman was named by Foreign Policy magazine in its list of top global thinkers. In the same year, his book Thinking, Fast and Slow, which summarizes much of his research, was published and became a best seller.

Kahneman was professor emeritus of psychology and public affairs at Princeton University's Princeton School of Public and International Affairs. Kahneman was a founding partner of TGG Group, a business and philanthropy consulting company. He was married to cognitive psychologist and Royal Society Fellow Anne Treisman, who died in 2018.

== Early life ==
Daniel Kahneman was born in Tel Aviv, in the British Mandate of Palestine (now Israel), on March 5, 1934 while his mother Rachel (née Shenzon) was visiting her family. His parents were Lithuanian Jews who had emigrated to France in the early 1920s; his paternal uncle was Rabbi Yosef Shlomo Kahaneman, the head of the Ponevezh Yeshiva. He spent his childhood years in Paris. Kahneman and his family were in Paris when it was occupied by Nazi Germany in 1940. His father, Efrayim, was picked up in the first major round-up of French Jews, but he was released after six weeks due to the intervention of his employer, La Cagoule backer and l'Oreal founder Eugène Schueller. The family was on the run for the remainder of the war but survived except for Efrayim who died of diabetes in 1944. Kahneman and his family then moved to Mandatory Palestine in 1948, just before the creation of the state of Israel.

Kahneman wrote of his experience in Nazi-occupied France, explaining in part why he entered the field of psychology:

It must have been late 1941 or early 1942. Jews were required to wear the Star of David and to obey a 6 p.m. curfew. I had gone to play with a Christian friend and had stayed too late. I turned my brown sweater inside out to walk the few blocks home. As I was walking down an empty street, I saw a German soldier approaching. He was wearing the black uniform that I had been told to fear more than others – the one worn by specially recruited SS soldiers. As I came closer to him, trying to walk fast, I noticed that he was looking at me intently. Then he beckoned me over, picked me up, and hugged me. I was terrified that he would notice the star inside my sweater. He was speaking to me with great emotion, in German. When he put me down, he opened his wallet, showed me a picture of a boy, and gave me some money. I went home more certain than ever that my mother was right: people were endlessly complicated and interesting.

— Nobel Prize Bio 2002

== Education and early career ==
In 1954, Kahneman received his Bachelor of Science degree in psychology and mathematics, from the Hebrew University of Jerusalem. Israeli intellectual Yeshayahu Leibowitz, whom Kahneman describes as influential in his intellectual development, was Kahneman's chemistry teacher at Beit-Hakerem High School, and Kahneman's physiology professor at university. Kahneman was average in mathematics, but he thrived in psychology. Kahneman was led to psychology when he discovered in his teens that he was more interested in why people believe in God than in whether God exists, and more interested in indignation than in ethics.

In 1954, he began his military service in the Israel Defense Forces as a second lieutenant, serving for a year in infantry. He then served in the psychology department of the IDF. He developed a structured interview for combat recruits, which remained in use in the IDF for several decades.

In 1958, he went to the United States to study for his PhD in Psychology at the University of California, Berkeley. His 1961 dissertation, advised by Susan Ervin, examined relations between adjectives in the semantic differential and allowed him to "engage in two of [his] favorite pursuits: the analysis of complex correlational structures and FORTRAN programming".

== Academic career ==
=== Cognitive psychology ===
Kahneman received a bachelor's degree in psychology and mathematics from the Hebrew University of Jerusalem in 1954 and a degree in psychology from the University of California, Berkeley, in 1961, and went on to become a lecturer in psychology at the Hebrew University of Jerusalem later in 1961 and was promoted to senior lecturer in 1966. His early work focused on visual perception and attention. From 1965 to 1966, he was a visiting scientist at the University of Michigan, a fellow at the Center for Cognitive Studies and a lecturer in cognitive psychology at Harvard University in 1966 to 1967, and during the summers of 1968 and 1969 he was a visiting scientist at the Applied Psychology Research Unit in Cambridge. His work on attention led to a book, Attention and Effort, in which he presented a theory of effort based on studies of pupillary changes during mental tasks. Kahneman also developed rules of counterfactual thinking, and published "Norm Theory" with Dale Miller.

=== Judgment and decision-making ===
Kahneman's lengthy collaboration with Amos Tversky began in 1969, after Tversky gave a guest lecture at one of Kahneman's seminars at Hebrew University. Their first jointly written paper, "Belief in the Law of Small Numbers," was published in 1971. They published seven journal articles in the years 1971 to 1979. They flipped a coin to determine whose name would appear first on their initial paper and alternated thereafter. Their article "Judgment Under Uncertainty: Heuristics and Biases" introduced the notion of anchoring. Kahneman and Tversky spent an entire year at an office in the Van Leer Institute in Jerusalem, writing this paper. They spent more than three years revising an early version of prospect theory that was completed in early 1975. The final version was published in 1979 in Econometrica, the leading economic journal at the time. That paper became the most cited in Econometrica. They began doing empirical psychological experiments, discovered violation of standard expected utility theory, and developed the prospect theory.

The pair also teamed with Paul Slovic to edit a compilation entitled Judgment Under Uncertainty: Heuristics and Biases (1982) that was a summary of their work and of other recent advances that had influenced their thinking. Kahneman was ultimately awarded the Nobel Memorial Prize in Economics in 2002 "for having integrated insights from psychological research into economic science, especially concerning human judgment and decision-making under uncertainty". In the introduction of Thinking, Fast and Slow, Kahneman acknowledges and shares that "our collaboration on judgment and decision making was the reason for the Nobel Prize that I received in 2002, which Amos Tversky would have shared had he not died, aged fifty-nine, in 1996". Kahneman left Hebrew University in 1978 to take a position at the University of British Columbia. In 2021, Kahneman co-authored a book with Olivier Sibony and Cass Sunstein, titled Noise: A Flaw in Human Judgment.

The Harvard psychologist and author Daniel Gilbert said of Kahneman that: "His central message could not be more important, namely, that human reason left to its own devices is apt to engage in a number of fallacies and systematic errors, so if we want to make better decisions in our personal lives and as a society, we ought to be aware of these biases and seek workarounds. That's a powerful and important discovery."

=== Behavioral economics ===
Kahneman and Tversky both spent the academic year 1977 to 1978 at Stanford University, Kahneman as a fellow at the school's Center for Advanced Study in the Behavioral Sciences interdisciplinary research lab and Tversky with a visiting appointment at the university's psychology department. Richard Thaler was a visiting professor at the Stanford branch of the National Bureau of Economic Research during that same year. According to Kahneman: "We soon became friends, and have ever since had a considerable influence on each other's thinking." Building in part on prospect theory and Kahneman and Tversky's body of work, Thaler published "Toward a Positive Theory of Consumer Choice" in 1980, a paper which Kahneman called "the founding text of behavioral economics". Richard Thaler obtained a grant from the Russell Sage Foundation to spend the academic year 1984 to 1985 with Kahneman at the University of British Columbia. Together with Kahneman's friend Jack Knetsch they worked on two papers on fairness and on the endowment effect.

From 1979 to 1986, Kahneman published multiple articles and chapters. Kahneman published one chapter during the years 1987 to 1989. A few papers on decision making appeared after that hiatus, notably cumulative prospect theory, and an explanation of risk-taking by unrealistic "bold forecasts", but the focus of Kahneman's research from that time was the study of subjective experience.

=== Variants of utility ===
Economists distinguish experienced utility—in the sense of Jeremy Bentham and utilitarianism—from decision utility, which is the utility explained by and derived from choices. The experienced utility of an episode is formalized as the temporal integration of momentary utility.

Kahneman further distinguished the expected utility from both remembered and predicted utility. Predicted utility (better known as affective forecasting) is the predicted experienced utility for a future experience. Remembered utility is the evaluation of a past experience. The essential finding of many experiments is that memories of experienced utility are systematically inaccurate. Furthermore, the remembered evaluation of past episodes (remembered utility) is the best predictor of subsequent decision utility.

One of the cognitive biases of remembered utility is called the peak–end rule. It affects how people remember the pleasantness or unpleasantness of experiences. It states that a person's overall impression of past events is determined, for the most part, not by the total pleasure and suffering it contained, but by how it felt at its peak and at its end. For example, the memory of a painful colonoscopy is improved if the examination is extended by three minutes in which the scope is still inside but not moved anymore, resulting in a moderately uncomfortable sensation. This extended colonoscopy, despite involving more pain overall, is remembered less negatively due to the reduced pain at the end. This even increases the likelihood for the patient to return for subsequent procedures.

==== Happiness and life satisfaction ====
The analysis of the experienced utility of short episodes readily extends to the broader notion of happiness. This connection led Kahneman, together with Ed Diener and Norbert Schwarz to organize a workshop, which yielded a book that covered a range of topics in hedonic psychology, which they defined as "the study of what makes experiences and life pleasant or unpleasant. It is concerned with feelings of pleasure and pain, of interest and boredom, of joy and sorrow, and of satisfaction and dissatisfaction. It is also concerned with the whole range of circumstances, from the biological to the societal, that occasion suffering and enjoyment.

Most studies of well-being use retrospective questions such as "How happy are you these days?". A smaller number of studies use experience sampling, in which people are probed at random times during the day, and asked to rate their experience of the present moment. Much later (source TED talk) Kahneman described this distinction in terms of two selves: the experiencing self, which is aware of pleasure and pain as they are happening, and the remembering self, which shows the aggregate pleasure and pain over an extended period of time.

Kahneman initially believed that the happiness of the experiencing self is the true measure of well-being. Around 2000, he assembled a team consisting of Alan Krueger, David Schkade, Norbert Schwarz and Arthur Stone. The mission of the team was to create a measure of experienced happiness that economists could take seriously. As a more practical substitute to the experience sampling techniques of the time, the team developed The Day-Reconstruction Method, in which participants described the day as a sequence of episodes, and rated the experience on several affective dimensions. Kahneman also participated in the formulation of the well-being module of the Gallup World Poll. The effort to measure experienced happiness was only partly successful. Measures of affect are routinely included in well-being questionnaires, but the idea that experienced happiness is the better concept did not hold. Kahneman defined happiness in terms of "what I experience here and now", but says that in reality humans pursue life satisfaction, which "is connected to a large degree to social yardsticks—achieving goals, meeting expectations".

==== The focusing illusion ====
With David Schkade, Kahneman developed the notion of the focusing illusion to explain in part the mistakes people make when estimating the effects of different scenarios on their future happiness (also known as affective forecasting, which has been studied extensively by Daniel Gilbert). The "illusion" occurs when people consider the impact of one specific factor on their overall happiness, they tend to greatly exaggerate the importance of that factor, while overlooking the numerous other factors that would in most cases have a greater impact. In what has been considered his most famous dictum, Kahneman described the illusion in Thinking, Fast and Slow, writing: "Nothing in life is as important as you think it is when you are thinking about it."

A basic example is provided by Kahneman and Schkade's 1998 paper, "Does living in California make people happy? A focusing illusion in judgments of life satisfaction". In that paper, students in the Midwest and in California reported similar levels of life satisfaction, but the Midwesterners thought their Californian peers would be happier. The only distinguishing information the Midwestern students had when making these judgments was that their hypothetical peers lived in California. Thus, they "focused" on this distinction, thereby overestimating the effect of the weather in California on its residents' satisfaction with life.

=== Teaching ===
Kahneman taught at the Hebrew University in Jerusalem from 1970–1978 and moonlighted at the University of the Negev at Beersheba because Hebrew University didn't pay enough. He then became a professor at the University of British Columbia, leaving in 1986. Next, he taught at the University of California, Berkeley, from 1986 to 1994. Thereafter, Kahneman was a senior scholar and faculty member emeritus at Princeton University's Department of Psychology and Princeton School of Public and International Affairs. He was also a fellow at Hebrew University and a Gallup Senior Scientist.

== Partnership with Amos Tversky ==
Kahneman and Amos Tversky's collaboration helped launch the field of behavioral economics.

Kahneman and Tversky first crossed paths in the psychology department at the Hebrew University of Jerusalem in 1968. In the period between 1971 and 1979 they published work on judgment and decision-making that led to Kahneman winning the Nobel Prize. During this period they were described as "inseparable" and as "soul mates".

After leaving Israel in 1978 and accepting positions at different universities, the intensity and exclusivity of their earlier period of joint collaboration was reduced. According to Kahneman the collaboration "tapered off" in the early 1980s, although they tried to revive it, but the period when Kahneman published almost exclusively with Tversky ended in 1983, when he published two papers with Anne Treisman, his wife since 1978. Factors contributing to this estrangement included Tversky receiving most of the external credit for the output of the partnership, and a reduction in the generosity with which Tversky and Kahneman interacted with each other, leading Kahneman to say, "I eventually divorced him". However, they would continue to publish together until the end of Tversky's life, and worked together on the introduction to an edited collection of papers related to their work during the last six month's of Tversky's life.

== Legacy ==
Former colleague and Princeton faculty member Eldar Shafir said that Kahneman "was a giant in the field" and that "many areas in the social sciences simply have not been the same since he arrived on the scene. He will be greatly missed". Behavioural economist Richard Thaler said Kahneman's work was "one of the most important accomplishments of 20th century science," and added, "It's hard to think of any psychologist whose work has influenced so many different fields". Kahneman and Tversky were "the founders of our field", said Ulrike Malmendier, a behavioral economist and member of the German official council of economic experts.

== Personal life ==
Kahneman married his first wife, Irah Kahn, when they were students; they had two children. The couple later divorced. Their daughter Lenore, who works in pharmaceuticals, assisted her father on his Nobel lecture. His son Michael, has schizophrenia. Kahneman was quoted as saying that Michael "would have been a very brilliant economist."

From 1978 until her death in 2018, Kahneman was married to the cognitive psychologist Anne Treisman. They lived part-time in Berkeley, California. From 2020, Kahneman lived in New York City with Barbara Tversky, also a cognitive psychologist, and the widow of his long-time collaborator Amos Tversky.

Kahneman described himself as a very hard worker, "a worrier" and "not a jolly person", and said that he was "quite capable of great enjoyment, and I've had a great life". Richard Thaler called his close friend an "avid pessimist." Thaler, a self-described optimist, said Kahneman claimed that worrying was rational, "because he would not be disappointed as much with the outcomes of life."

== Death ==
Kahneman died on March 27, 2024, three weeks after his ninetieth birthday. Given his personal experience with dementia, from which both his mother and his wife Anne Treisman had suffered, Kahneman died by assisted suicide, with help from assisted-suicide organization Pegasos, in Nunningen, Switzerland. The manner and location of his death were only revealed in March 2025.

== Awards and recognition ==
- In 1982, he received (joint with Amos Tversky), the Award for Distinguished Scientific Contributions from the American Psychological Association
- In 1992, he received the Distinguished Scientific Contribution Award from the Society for Consumer Psychology
- In 1995, he was selected for the Hilgard Award for Lifetime Contributions to General Psychology
- In 1995, he received (joint with Amos Tversky), the Warren Medal of the Society of Experimental Psychologists
- In 2001, he was elected a member of the National Academy of Sciences
- In 2002, Kahneman received the Nobel Memorial Prize in Economic Sciences, despite being a research psychologist, for his work in prospect theory. Kahneman stated he has never taken a single economics course.
- Kahneman, co-recipient with Tversky, earned the 2003 University of Louisville Grawemeyer Award for Psychology.
- In 2004, he was elected a member of the American Philosophical Society.
- In 2005, he received the Decision Analysis Publication Award (for best paper published in 2003) by the Decision Analysis Society
- In 2006, he received the Kampe de Feriet Award from the Society for Information Processing and Management of Uncertainty
- In 2006, he received the Thomas Schelling Prize for intellectual contribution to public policy through the Kennedy School for Public Policy, Harvard University
- In 2006, he received (joint with Amos Tversky) the Frank P. Ramsey Medal of the Decision Analysis Society
- In 2007, he was presented with the American Psychological Association's Award for Outstanding Lifetime Contributions to Psychology.
- In 2008, he received the John McGovern Award Lecture of The American Association for the Advancement of Science
- In 2008, Kahneman was elected to be a Corresponding Fellow at the British Academy
- In 2010, he received the Tufts University, Leontief Prize
- In 2011, he became a Distinguished Fellow of The American Economic Association
- In both 2011 and 2012, he made the Bloomberg 50 most influential people in global finance.
- On November 9, 2011, he was awarded the Talcott Parsons Prize by the American Academy of Arts and Sciences.
- His book Thinking, Fast and Slow was the winner of the 2011 Los Angeles Times Book Award for Current Interest and the National Academy of Sciences Communication Award for the best book published in 2011.
- In 2012, he was accepted as corresponding academician at the Real Academia Española (Economic and Financial Sciences).
- In 2013, he received the McGovern Award in Science by the Cosmos Club
- In 2013, he received the SAGE-CASBS Award for Social Science
- On August 8, 2013, President Barack Obama announced that Daniel Kahneman would be a recipient of the Presidential Medal of Freedom.
- In December 2018, Kahneman was named a Gold Medal Honoree by The National Institute of Social Sciences.
- In 2015, The Economist listed him as the seventh most influential economist in the world.
- In 2019, Kahneman received the Golden Plate Award of the American Academy of Achievement.
- In 2023, he was presented with the Helen Dinerman Award of the World Association for Public Opinion Research

== Honorary degrees ==
- 2001, University of Pennsylvania
- 2002, University of Trento
- 2003, The New School
- 2003, Ben-Gurion University of the Negev
- 2004, Harvard University
- 2004, The University of East Anglia
- 2004, University of British Columbia
- 2005, University of Milan
- 2006, Université de Paris I
- 2006, University of Alberta
- 2007, University of Rome La Sapienza
- 2009, Erasmus University
- 2009, Georgetown University
- 2010, University of Michigan
- 2011, Carnegie-Mellon University
- 2013, Icahn School of Medicine at Mount Sinai
- 2013, Cambridge University
- 2014, The Hebrew University of Jerusalem
- 2014, Yale University
- 2015, McGill University
- 2016, Stellenbosch University
- 2016, University of Haifa
- 2021, HEC Paris
- 2023, York University

== Notable contributions ==
- Anchoring-and-adjusting
- Attribute substitution
- Availability heuristic
- Base rate fallacy
- Cognitive bias
- Conjunction fallacy
- Dictator game
- Framing (social sciences)
- Loss aversion
- Optimism bias
- Planning fallacy
- Prospect theory
  - Cumulative prospect theory
- Reference class forecasting
- Representativeness heuristic
- Simulation heuristic
- Status quo bias

== Books ==
- Kahneman, Daniel (1973). Attention and Effort. Prentice-Hall.
- Kahneman, Daniel; Slovic, Paul; Tversky, Amos (1982). Judgment Under Uncertainty: Heuristics and Biases. Cambridge University Press.
- Kahneman, Daniel; Diener, E.; Schwarz, N. (1999). Well-Being: The Foundations of Hedonic Psychology. Russell Sage Foundation.
- Kahneman, Daniel; Tversky, Amos (2000). Choices, Values and Frames. Cambridge University Press.
- Kahneman, Daniel; Gilovich, Thomas; Griffin, Dale (2002). Heuristics and Biases: The Psychology of Intuitive Judgment. Cambridge University Press. ISBN 978-0521792608.
- Kahneman, Daniel (2011). Thinking, Fast and Slow. Farrar, Straus and Giroux. ISBN 978-0374275631. (Reviewed by Freeman Dyson in The New York Review of Books, December 22, 2011, pp. 40–44)
- Kahneman, Daniel; Sibony, Olivier; Sunstein, Cass R. (2021). Noise: A Flaw in Human Judgment. William Collins. ISBN 978-0008308995.

== See also ==
- Fooled by Randomness
- List of economists
- List of Israeli Nobel laureates
- List of Jewish Nobel laureates
- List of Nobel laureates in Economics

Awards
Preceded by George A. Akerlof; A. Michael Spence; Joseph E. Stiglitz	Laureate of the Nobel Memorial Prize in Economics; 2002; Served alongside: Vernon L. Smith	Succeeded by Robert F. Engle III; Clive W. J. Granger
