= Matthew Rabin =

American economist (born 1963)

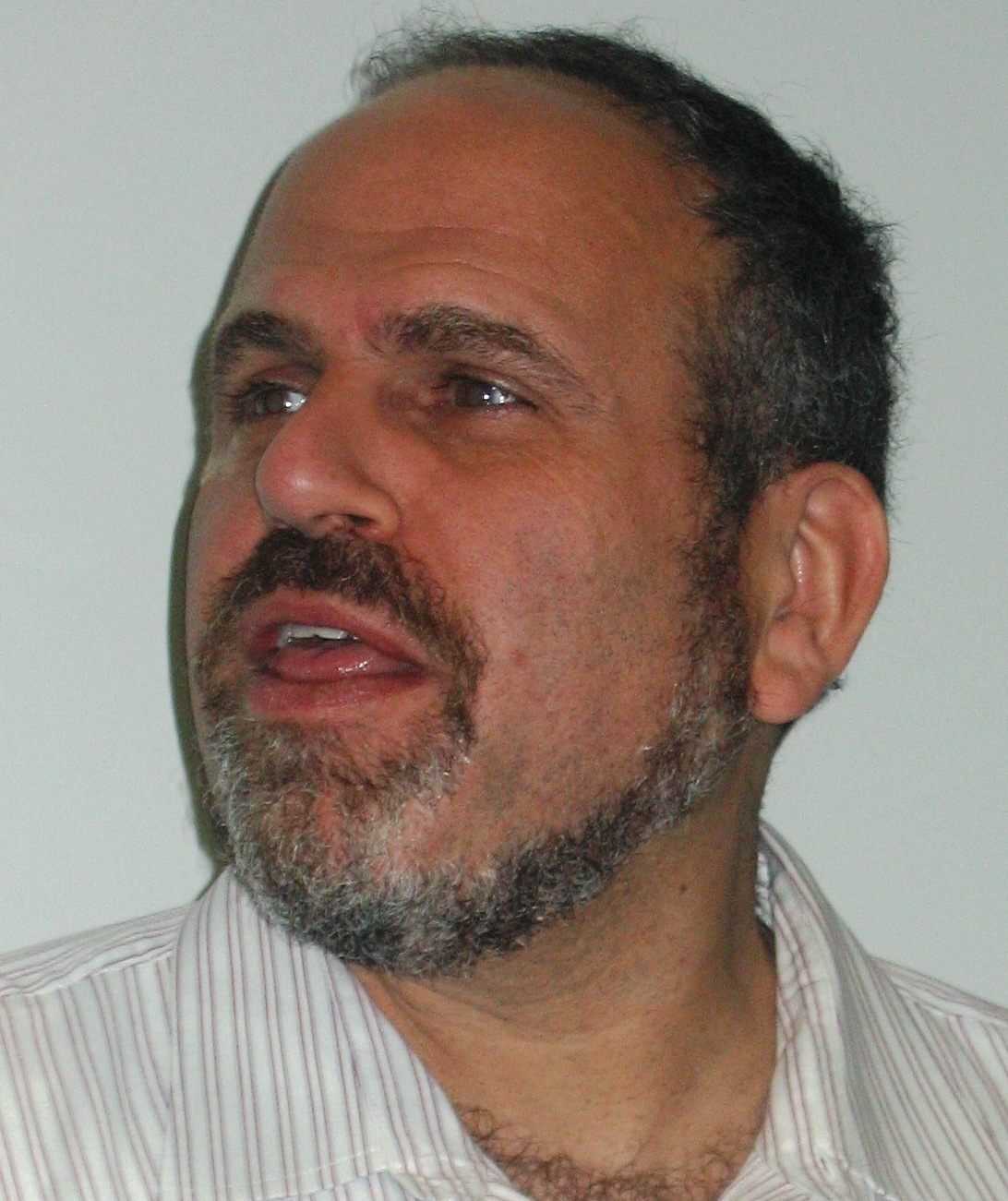
- Rabin in 2008
- Born: December 27, 1963 (age 62)

Academic background
- Education: University of Wisconsin–Madison; MIT
- Doctoral advisor: Drew Fudenberg

Academic work
- Discipline: Behavioral economics, Game theory
- Doctoral students: Gary Charness; Jeffrey C. Ely
- Notable ideas: Cursed equilibrium, Rabin fairness, Rabin's paradox
- Awards: John Bates Clark Medal; John von Neumann Award
- Website: Information at IDEAS / RePEc

Matthew Joel Rabin (/ˈreɪbɪn/; born December 27, 1963) is an American economist and the Pershing Square Professor of Behavioral Economics in the Harvard Economics Department and Harvard Business School. He is one of the most influential contemporary scholars in behavioral economics. His research uses formal economic theory to incorporate psychological factors and systematic behavioral biases that are often absent from traditional economic models, and to study how they affect individual decisions and market outcomes. His work spans a wide range of topics, with notable contributions to fairness and social preferences, present bias and self-control, risk attitudes, loss aversion and reference dependence, and systematic errors people make in belief formation and probabilistic reasoning.

== Background ==
Rabin received a Bachelor of Arts in Economics and Mathematics from the University of Wisconsin–Madison in 1984. He subsequently studied at the London School of Economics as a graduate research student before entering the Massachusetts Institute of Technology, where he received his PhD in economics in 1989. The same year, he joined the economics faculty at the University of California, Berkeley as an assistant professor. He was promoted to full professor in 1999 and held the Edward G. and Nancy S. Jordan Professorship of Economics from 2003 to 2014. After 25 years at Berkeley, he moved to Harvard University in 2014 as the Pershing Square Professor of Behavioral Economics. He is a member of the Russell Sage Foundation Behavioral Economics Roundtable and co-organizer of the Russell Sage Summer Institute in Behavioral Economics. Rabin has also held visiting positions at MIT, the London School of Economics, Northwestern University, Harvard, and the California Institute of Technology, and has been a visiting scholar at the Center for Advanced Study in the Behavioral Sciences at Stanford University and the Russell Sage Foundation.

== Academic Work ==
Rabin's research spans behavioral economics and game theory, with particularly influential work on fairness and social preferences, present bias and self-control, risk aversion, reference-dependent preferences and loss aversion, and systematic errors in probabilistic and strategic reasoning. His other work has examined topics including projection bias, choice bracketing, learning, and behavioral public policy. In 2001, he was awarded the John Bates Clark Medal by the American Economic Association. He was named a MacArthur Fellow in 2000 and received the John von Neumann Award from the Rajk László College for Advanced Studies in 2006.

=== Fairness and social preferences ===
In a 1993 American Economic Review paper, Rabin developed a model now known as Rabin fairness, incorporating reciprocal social preferences into game theory. In the model, people care not only about their own material payoffs, but may sacrifice material payoff to reward those they believe are treating them kindly and to punish those they believe are treating them unkindly. Because perceived kindness depends on beliefs about other players' intentions, preferences depend partly on beliefs as well as material outcomes. Rabin defined a fairness equilibrium combining these motives with material self-interest: when material stakes are small, fairness considerations can substantially alter equilibrium predictions, whereas as stakes become large, predictions approach those of Nash equilibrium.

=== Self-control and present bias ===
Beginning in the late 1990s, Rabin and economist Ted O'Donoghue developed a series of papers on self-control problems using present-biased, time-inconsistent preferences, represented by quasi-hyperbolic discounting, also known as the $\beta$-$\delta$ model. Their work emphasized how behavior depends not only on present bias itself, but also on whether people correctly anticipate their own future self-control problems. In Doing It Now or Later (1999), O'Donoghue and Rabin distinguished between sophisticated agents, who correctly anticipate their future self-control problems, and naive agents, who do not. They showed that naive agents may repeatedly procrastinate activities with immediate costs, while present bias can also cause activities with immediate rewards to be undertaken too early; sophistication mitigates procrastination but can exacerbate the latter problem. Their subsequent work examined how incentives can be designed for procrastinating agents, and how having more choices can sometimes induce or worsen procrastination, for example when a person plans to complete a more attractive option later but ultimately completes none. The framework has implications for intertemporal choice in areas including saving and addiction.

=== Rabin's calibration theorem ===
In 2000, Rabin introduced an influential calibration result on risk aversion in an Econometrica paper, a result now known as Rabin's paradox or Rabin's calibration theorem. The theorem shows that, under expected utility with a concave utility function over final wealth, even moderate aversion to small favorable gambles across a range of wealth levels implies implausibly extreme aversion to large-stakes gambles. Rabin used this result to argue that substantial small-stakes risk aversion cannot plausibly be explained primarily by the diminishing marginal utility of wealth, motivating explanations based instead on mechanisms such as loss aversion and reference dependence.

=== Reference-dependent preferences ===
Between 2006 and 2009, Rabin, together with economist Botond Kőszegi, published a series of papers developing an expectations-based model of reference dependence and loss aversion, two central ideas associated with prospect theory. In Kőszegi and Rabin's model, outcomes are evaluated relative to a reference point determined by prior expectations about outcomes. Plans for future consumption both affect the future reference point and are determined to maximize the agent's experience given that reference point. This necessitates the invocation of personal equilibrium, a concept which applies game-theoretic notions of equilibrium to single-agent settings where decision-making is reflexive. The 2009 paper extends the model to dynamic settings where information about future consumption is gradually revealed. Kőszegi and Rabin introduce the notion of news utility—the pleasure or displeasure experienced when beliefs about present and future consumption change.

=== Beliefs and probabilistic reasoning ===
Rabin has also developed models of systematic errors in beliefs and probabilistic reasoning. In a 1999 paper with Joel Schrag, he modeled confirmation bias, in which people tend to interpret ambiguous information as supporting their existing beliefs. The model shows that this bias can generate overconfidence and can even lead an agent to become nearly certain of a false belief despite receiving an unlimited amount of information. In 2002, Rabin formalized belief in the law of small numbers, the tendency to expect small samples to resemble the population from which they are drawn more closely than they actually do. The model generates the gambler's fallacy and predicts that people will draw excessively strong conclusions from short sequences of observations, such as perceiving greater differences in ability among fund managers than actually exist.

Rabin's work on mistaken inference also extends to strategic settings. With economist Erik Eyster, he introduced cursed equilibrium in 2005 to model situations in which players fail to fully account for how other players' actions depend on their private information. In a cursed equilibrium, a player correctly predicts the overall distribution of others' actions but underestimates the correlation between those actions and the information on which they are based. The concept can account for behavior such as the winner's curse in common-value auctions and trade in adverse selection settings where standard equilibrium analysis predicts no trade, and has also been applied to voting and signaling.
