= Rabin's calibration theorem =

Paradox in expected-utility theory

In microeconomics and decision theory, Rabin's calibration theorem (also known as Rabin's paradox or Rabin's critique) is a theoretical result related to the calibration of risk aversion within expected-utility theory. In intuitive terms, it shows that an expected-utility maximizer who is moderately risk averse over small-stake gambles across a range of wealth levels must show implausibly high risk aversion over high stakes.

It is seen as a critique of how the classical model of diminishing marginal utility of wealth can represent risk-averse behavior over money within expected-utility theory. The result therefore suggests that small-stakes risk aversion is unlikely to be explained primarily by the concavity of utility over final wealth, and has motivated alternative explanations based on loss aversion and reference dependence. Models of reference-dependent preferences, such as those of Kőszegi and Rabin, can generate aversion to small-stakes risk through loss aversion rather than through strong curvature of utility over wealth.

The result was first shown by Matthew Rabin in 2000. Analogous calibration results have since been derived for non-expected-utility models of choice under uncertainty.

== Example ==
Consider an expected-utility decision-maker with wealth level $w$ and differentiable, concave Bernoulli utility function $u$. Imagine that she rejects the following lottery:

$$L = \begin{cases}
\text{win } \$125 \text{ with } 50\% \text{ chance,} \\
\text{lose } \$100 \text{ with } 50\% \text{ chance.}
\end{cases}$$

This implies that

$$0.5 u(w+125) + 0.5 u(w-100) < u(w)$$

$$\iff u(w+125) - u(w) < u(w) -u(w-100)$$

$$\iff \frac{u(w+125) - u(w)}{125} < \frac{100}{125} \frac{u(w) - u(w-100)}{100}.$$

Since $u$ is concave, we have

$$u'(w+125) \leq \frac{u(w+125) - u(w)}{125} < \frac{100}{125} \frac{u(w) - u(w-100)}{100} \leq \frac{100}{125} u'(w-100).$$

This means, therefore, that on each interval $[w-100, w+125]$ of length $225$ for which the above holds (i.e., the lottery is rejected), increasing wealth by $\$225$ reduces marginal utility $u'$ to at most $\frac{100}{125} = 0.8$ times its previous value. If the lottery continues to be rejected throughout the relevant range of wealth levels, receiving $\$1000$ would reduce marginal utility to at most $0.8^4 \approx 41\%$ of its current value, and receiving $\$10000$ would reduce it to at most $0.8^{44} \approx 0.0054\%$.

For example, suppose that the decision maker rejects the above lottery $L$ for all wealth levels $w \leq \$300,000$. This will imply that, at wealth level $w = \$290,000$, she rejects the following lottery:

$$L' = \begin{cases}
\text{win } \$160 \text{ billion with } 50\% \text{ chance,} \\
\text{lose } \$1000 \text{ with } 50\% \text{ chance.}
\end{cases}$$

Such rejection is intuitively absurd and empirically counterfactual.

== Theorem ==
Below is a tightened version of Rabin's original theorem given by Balter, Chau, and Schweizer.

Theorem: Suppose an expected-utility maximizer has an increasing and concave utility function $u$. Let $W\subseteq\mathbb R$ be an interval, and consider the binary lottery $L:=(-l,g;\tfrac12,\tfrac12)$, where $g>l>0$. If the decision maker rejects $L$ at every wealth level $w\in W$, then given any $m,n\in\mathbb N^+$, for any $w\in W$ such that $[w-ng,w+mg]\subseteq W$,

$$\underbrace{u(w+mg)-u(w)}_{\text{utility gain of }m\text{ steps up}}\le r(w)\sum_{i=0}^{m-1}q^i \quad\text{and}\quad r(w)\sum_{i=1}^{n}q^{-i}\le \underbrace{u(w)-u(w-ng)}_{\text{utility loss of }n\text{ steps down}},$$

where $q:=l/g<1$ and $r(w):=u(w+g)-u(w)$.

Since $0<q<1$, the first geometric sum converges as $m\to\infty$, while the second diverges to $\infty$ as $n\to\infty$. Thus, the utility gain from arbitrarily many upward steps remains bounded, whereas the utility loss from sufficiently many downward steps becomes arbitrarily large.

Corollary: Let $L':=(-ng,mg;\tfrac12,\tfrac12)$. Under the assumptions of the theorem, if $q^m+q^{-n}\ge 2$, then the decision maker rejects $L'$ at every wealth level $w\in W$ such that $[w-ng,w+mg]\subseteq W$.

In particular, if $W=\mathbb R$ and $q^{-n}\ge 2$, then the decision maker rejects $L'$ for every $m\in\mathbb N^+$ and at every wealth level. Thus, for a reasonably large fixed loss $ng$, the decision maker will reject the lottery no matter how large the possible gain $mg$ becomes.

For example, suppose the decision maker rejects the 50–50 lottery $(-10,11;\tfrac12,\tfrac12)$ at every wealth level. Then the theorem implies the striking conclusion that the decision maker must also reject every 50–50 lottery of the form $(-100,G;\tfrac12,\tfrac12)$, no matter how large the finite gain $G$ is.

To see this, here $q=10/11$, and $q^{-8}=(11/10)^8>2$. The corollary therefore implies rejection of $(-88,11m;\tfrac12,\tfrac12)$ for every positive integer $m$. For any finite $G$, choose $m$ such that $11m\ge G$. Since $(-88,11m;\tfrac12,\tfrac12)$ is better in both outcomes than $(-100,G;\tfrac12,\tfrac12)$, monotonicity implies rejection of the latter as well.

== Extensions ==
Zvi Safra and Uzi Segal extended Rabin's calibration results to any model which has a Gâteaux differentiable utility $V$ from lotteries over final wealth. This includes many non-expected-utility models, such as rank-dependent expected utility or Gul's disappointment aversion.

James C. Cox and others have also shown that any utility representation which is nonlinear in either probabilities or payoffs suffers from similar calibrational problems.
