= Politician =

Person active in politics

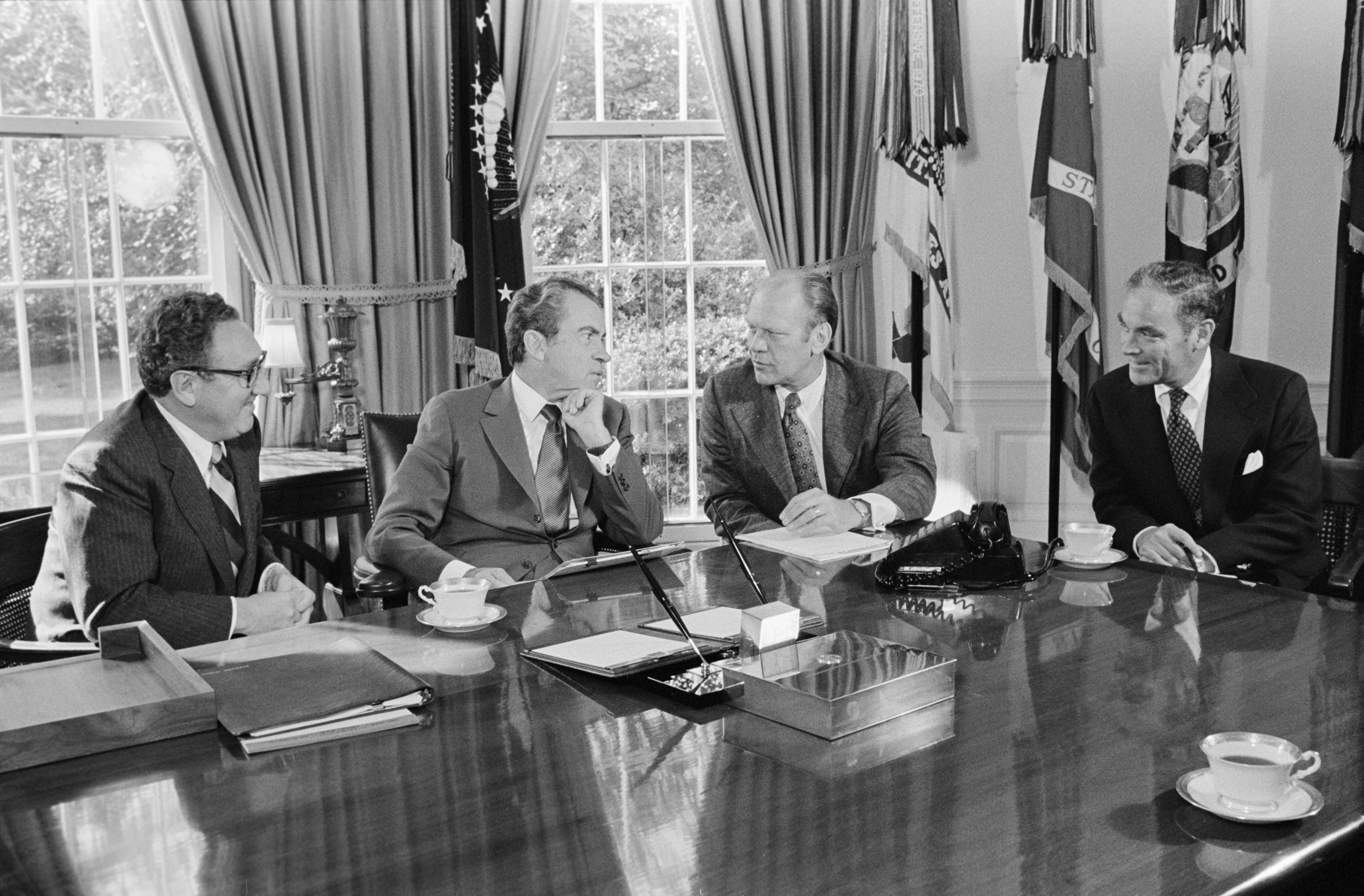
- American politicians (Kissinger, Nixon, Ford, Haig) in the White House's Oval Office discussing Representative Ford's nomination to the vice presidency

Occupation
- Names: President; Vice President; Member of Congress/Congressman/Representative; Senator; Prime Minister; Deputy Prime Minister; Premier; Deputy Premier; Chief Minister; Governor-General; Minister; Speaker; Member of Parliament; Member of the Legislative Assembly; Governor; Lieutenant Governor/Vice Governor; Chairperson; Chancellor; Mayor; Deputy Mayor/Vice Mayor; Senior Advisor/Advisor; First Lady/Second Lady; Secretary of State; Councillor
- Occupation type: Politician
- Activity sectors: Government

Description
- Competencies: Leadership; Critical thinking; Public speaking; Law making; Decision making; Public influence; Budgeting; Public relations; Statesmanship
- Education required: Qualification is based on the constitution
- Fields of employment: Government
- Related jobs: Monarch

A politician is a person who participates in policy-making processes, usually holding a position in a political party or an elective position in government. Politicians make decisions and influence the formulation of public policy. The roles or duties that politicians perform vary depending on the level of government, whether local, state, or national. The ideological orientation that politicians adopt often stems from their previous experience, education, beliefs, and the political parties they belong to. They try to shape public opinion accordingly.

Politicians sometimes face many challenges and mistakes that may affect their credibility and ability to persuade. These mistakes include political corruption resulting from their use and exploitation of power to achieve self interest. Ideally, they prioritize the public interest over their own profit. Challenges include how to keep up with the development of social media and confronting opposition media, in addition to discrimination for or against them on the basis of gender or race.

== Definitions ==
Standard dictionary definitions include a range of political activists under the definition of "politician." Merriam Webster Dictionary (2025) states:

Politician: 1: a person experienced in the art or science of government especially: one actively engaged in conducting the business of a government. 2a : a person engaged in party politics as a profession.

Oxford English Dictionary (1989 edition) states:

Politician 2b: One keenly interested in politics; one who engages in party politics, or in political strife, or who makes politics his profession or business; also (esp. in U.S.), in a sinister sense, one who lives by politics as a trade.

== Identity ==
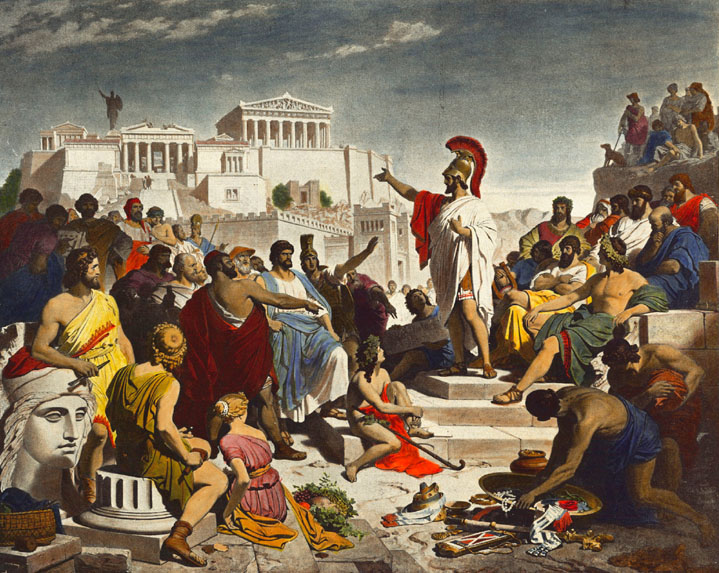
Nineteenth-century painting by Philipp Foltz depicting the Athenian politician Pericles delivering his famous funeral oration in front of the Assembly.

Politicians are people who participate in policy-making, in a multifaceted variety of positions of responsibility both domestically and internationally.

In ancient Greece, Pericles of Athens played an important role in politics, both in public discussions and in decision-making as depicted in Philip Foltz's 19th-century painting.

Over time the figure of the politician has evolved to include many forms and functions. In the United States, George Washington played a pivotal role as a politician because he served as the first President of the United States, shaping the official role and setting many precedents. Today, political offices take many forms, held by people called (for example) premiers, ministers, mayors, governors, senators, or presidents, each with its own duties.

Though popular discourse may equate politicians with "leaders", politicians may primarily conduct themselves in the political process without engaging in leading — this class of politicians may include: representative delegates, executive functionaries or administrators, (Note: Some politicians - whether elected or appointed - have successful careers in administering government ministries or departments - without necessarily acting as political leaders.) diligent bureaucratic cadres, and party hacks submissively propping up a voting majority. While government leaders are generally considered politicians, not all politicians are subject to voters: autocratic and dictatorial regimes remain extant.

The identity of politicians is influenced by their social and work environments, by their ideology, and by any parties with which they may associate; furthermore, the development of means of communication and social media have increased public participation in policy-making, leading to a reformation of politicians' identities and increasing the complexity of political work.

== Media and rhetoric ==
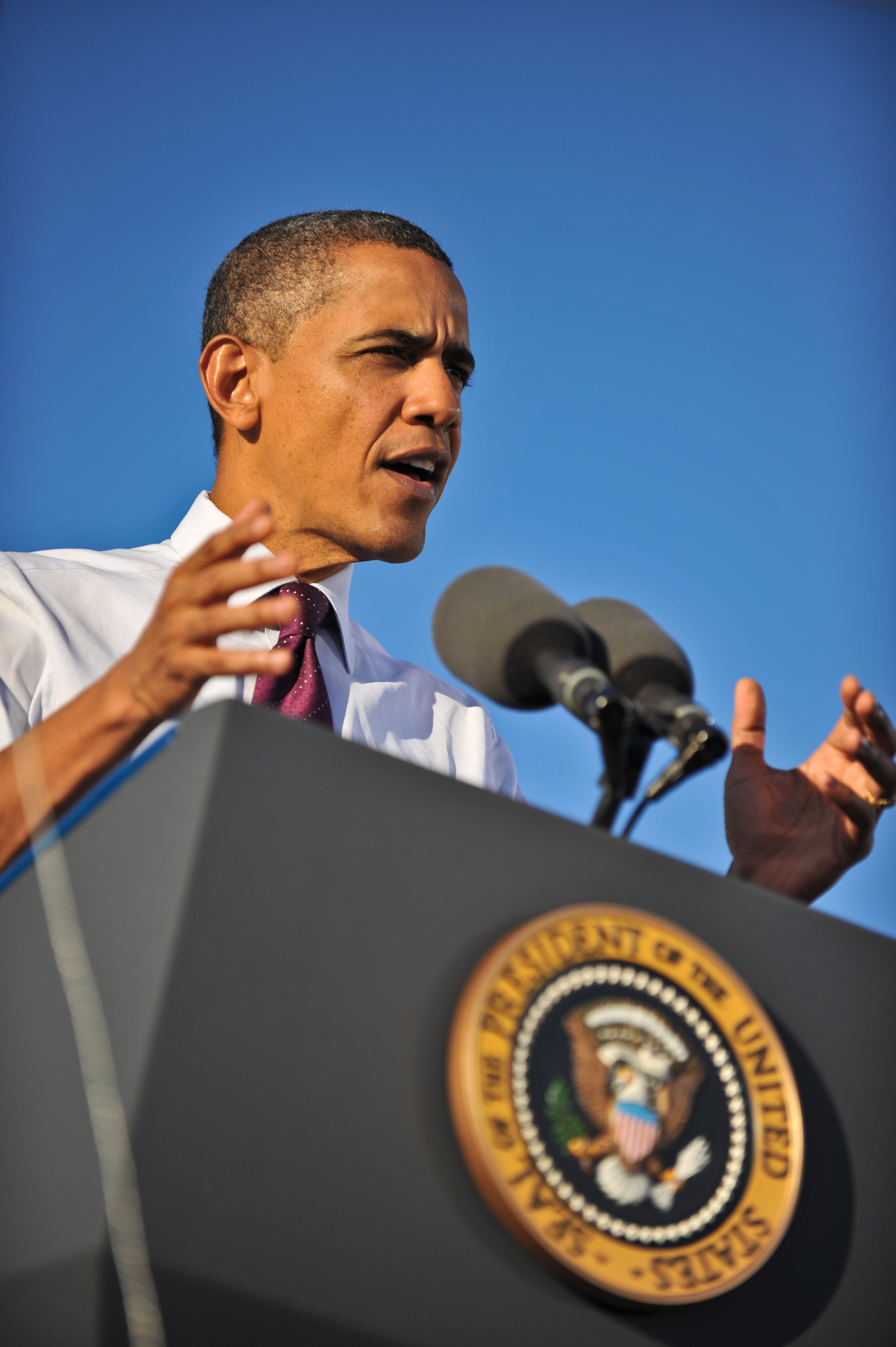
Barack Obama, Public Speech, Technology and Innovation, Manufacturing, Intel Fab 42. Political leaders use public events to frame issues and influence public opinion by crafting appropriate rhetoric.

Politicians are influential people who use rhetoric to impact people as in speeches or campaign advertisements. They are especially known for using common themes, and media platforms that allow them to develop their political positions, developing communication between them and the people.

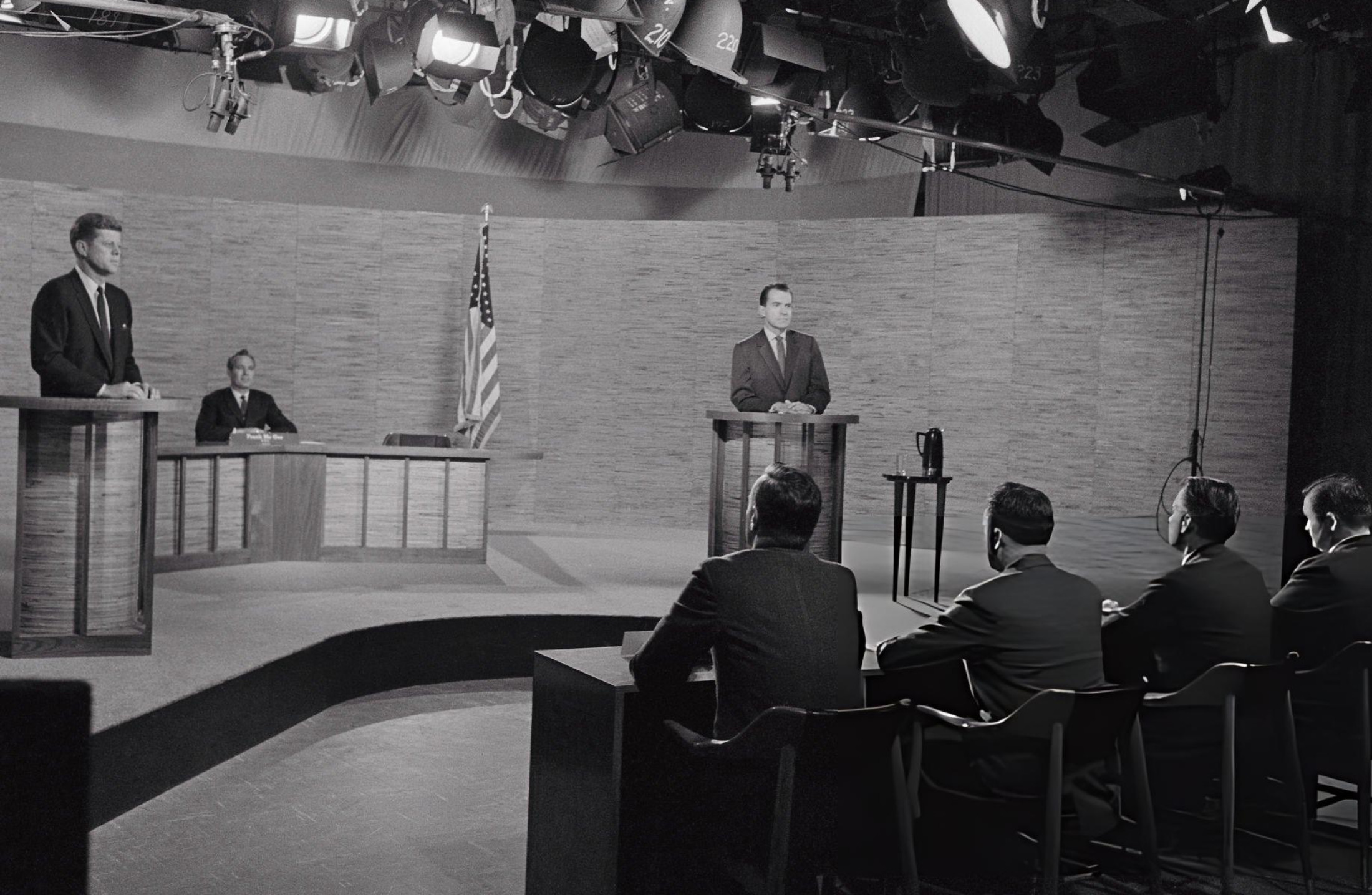
Photo of the second of the four presidential debates held during the 1960 presidential election. This debate took place in Washington, D.C. at NBC's WRC-TV studios on October 7, 1960.

Politicians of necessity become expert users of the media. Politicians in the 19th century made heavy use of newspapers, magazines, and pamphlets, as well as posters to disseminate their messages to appeal to voters' emotions and beliefs in their campaigns. In the 20th century, the scope of media expanded out into radio and television, and a major change occurred as speech was now presented visually as well as verbally as evidenced by the Kennedy-Nixon debates, marking a new era where visual media became crucial to campaigns. The twenty-first century has provided wide and diverse media platforms represented by Facebook, and Twitter, which has now become X, Instagram, YouTube, and others. This development has made their rhetorical messages faster, shorter more efficient, and characterized by the speed of spread and interaction.

Politicians, who rarely meet voters in person, seek to use the media as a means of communicating with people, winning votes, and obtaining political roles. Some research confirms that the media increases the popularity of a politician, and indicates that negative news has a stronger effect on popularity than positive news.

Some research has suggested that politicians tend to use social media more than traditional media because their perception of the traditional media's influence as a public informant greatly affects their satisfaction with democratic processes. So they prefer to use social media and communicate directly with people in order to have greater control over their message and easier communication.

This continuous evolution in media has made politicians adapt their discourse to these platforms for greater communication and effectiveness.

== Salary ==
Higher salaries of politicians can improve governance and decrease political corruption. The list of heads of state and government salaries shows large differences in the salaries of politicians.

== Careers and biographies ==
Mattozzi and Merlo argue that politicians typically follow two main career paths in modern democracies. The first is career politicians who remain in government until retirement. The second is political careerists, who have gained a reputation for their experience at various levels of government such as international, federal, state, and local governments, they often leave politics and start a new business venture using their political connections.

The personal histories of politicians have been frequently studied, as it is presumed that their experiences and characteristics shape their beliefs and behaviors. There are four pathways by which a politician's biography could influence their leadership style and abilities. First, a politician's biography may shape their core beliefs, which are essential to shaping their worldview. The second pathway is those personal experiences that influence a politician's skills and competence, and which determine where politicians focus their resources and attention as leaders. The third pathway refers to biographical characteristics that influence a politician's resource allocation and responses based on characteristics such as race or gender. The fourth pathway is how a politician's biography affects his public perception, which affects politicians' leadership style and their strategy for gaining people's respect.

== Characteristics ==
Numerous scholars have studied the characteristics of politicians and in economic class to explain characteristics impact on politicians' effectiveness and electoral success, comparing politicians involves different dimensions such as level of government (the local and national levels), political ideology (liberal or the more conservative), economic class, and comparing the more successful and less successful in terms of elections. Demographic factors such as age, gender, education, income, and race/ethnicity, play a role in shaping shape voter behavior and political preferences Politicians tend to be older than the population on average (gerontocracy).

Also, educational background in politics also plays an important role in shaping the political awareness of politicians and plays a major role in increasing people's confidence in them.

Politicians were found to have on average a political bias compared to median voters in many countries.

In some countries politicians are banned from having multiple citizenships to avoid dual loyalty.

== Challenges ==
In this century of advanced communications, politicians face challenges and difficulties while communicating with people through various social media platforms. The implicit importance of social media for politics stems from the virtual space these platforms have created for expressing ideas and spreading mutual messages without restrictions. Misinformation, rumors, and discrimination complicate their political behavior and communication with people.

Face-to-face contact with constituents is important to elected politicians. Face-to-face meetings force politicians to be directly address the issues that matter most to their constituents. They pay attention to tone of voice, looking for unspoken priorities, hopes and anxieties. Politicians with good memories will often ask whether a given problem is resolved satisfactorily, or about a person's family. Some politicians can remember thousands of names and faces. Presidents George W. Bush and Bill Clinton were known for their memories.

Political polarization created by the media plays a role in influencing politicians' behavior and communications, which reinforces negative campaigns. They also play a role in legislative gridlock and negatively impact public perception, which negatively impacts politicians' interests.

Additionally, research highlighted that politicians, especially populist politicians, may create a challenge for themselves by increasingly accusing the media of spreading misinformation or "fake news." Such accusations can undermine the credibility of media platforms, even though trust in the accused politicians remains largely unaffected. They will therefore have a negative impact on the credibility of media platforms, and this distrust may extend to the media institutions as a whole that politicians use to communicate with people.

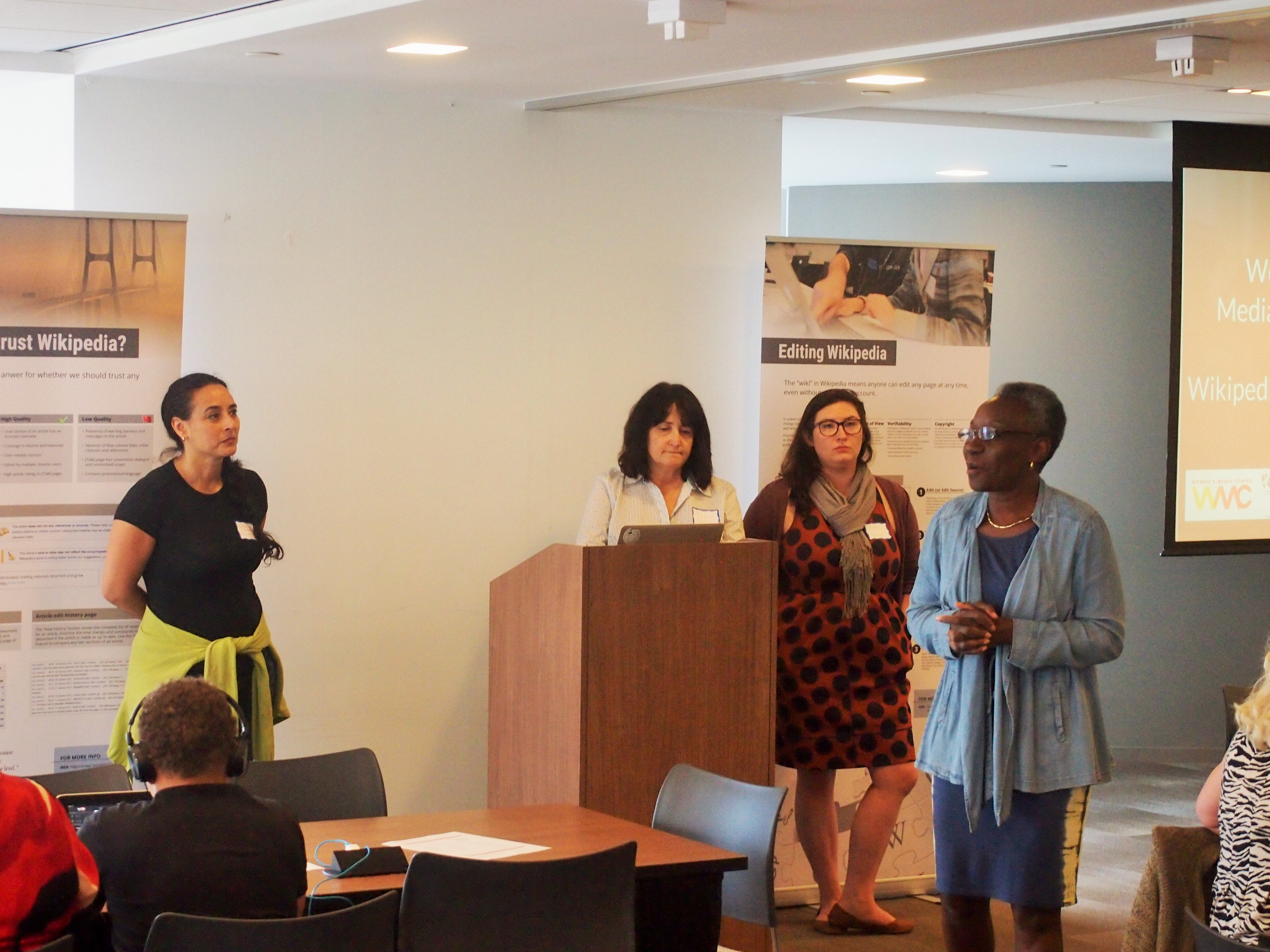
Presenters at Women in Media and Politics

Regarding the challenges of gender dynamics, particularly the role of women in politics, some recent research focuses on the life path of women in the political field and the challenges surrounding them. For example, there are studies on the "supermader" model in politics in Latin America, which illustrate the difficulties women face and how to balance their home and work and the distinction between women and men that negatively affects their acceptance in political work.

Short-termism describes the incentive for politicians towards short-term benefits due to the limited length of their term of office, which can result in under-prioritizing longer-term benefits and risks such as debt crisis, population ageing, pensions crisis and climate risk.

=== Corruption and Lobbying ===
Historically, in patronage-based systems, especially in the 19th century, winning politicians replaced civil servants and government employees who were not protected by the rules of government service with their supporters, a so-called "spoils system." In response to the corruption this system fostered, government job reforms were introduced. These reforms required elected politicians to work with existing civil servants and officials to pursue long-term public interest goals, rather than simply rewarding their supporters. This shift aimed to reduce corruption and prioritize the integrity of government positions.

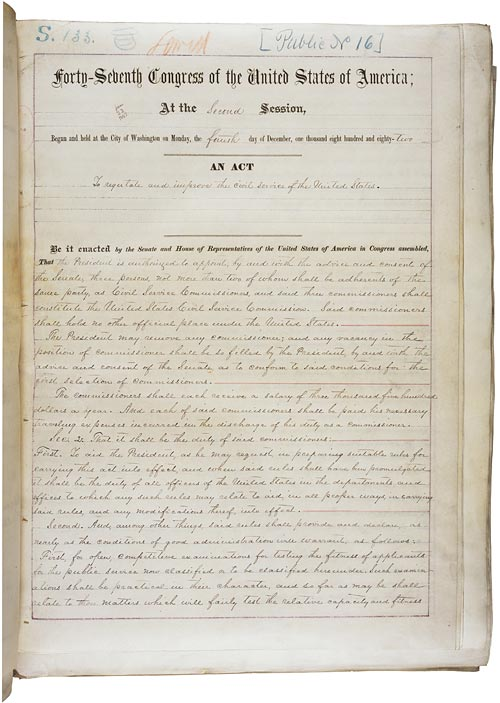
An Act to regulate and improve the civil service of the United States, January 16, 1883; Enrolled Acts and Resolutions of Congress, 1789–1996; General Records of the United States Government; Record Group 11; National Archives.

The Pendleton Civil Service Reform Act of 1883 passed by the U.S. Congress to combat corruption, favoritism in hiring, and the spoils system. It advocated hiring based on merit and protected civil servants from political influence.

In the modern century, many laws have been put in place to protect employees and reduce political corruption and favoritism in employment, for example, the Mexican government introduced the Federal Law on Administrative Responsibilities of Public Officials (2002) which establishes professional and accountable standards for officials against corruption and the spoils system.

Also, the Whistleblower Protection Enhancement Act of 2012 in the USA has established corruption to protect federal employees who report corruption, fraud, or other illegal activities within the government.

Lobbying tends to bias politician away from the preferences of the median citizen.

== Criticism ==
Some critics often accuse politicians of not communicating with the public. They accuse politicians' speeches of being sometimes overly formal, filled with many euphemisms and metaphors, and generally seen as an attempt to "obscure, mislead, and confuse".

Lack of awareness, selfishness, manipulation, political corruption and dishonesty are perceptions that people often accuse politicians of, and many see them as prioritizing personal interests over the public interests. Politicians in many countries are seen as the "most hated professionals," and the least trustworthy, leading to public skepticism and constant criticism.

In addition, some politicians tend to be negative, this strategy, although it does not enhance their chances of being re-elected or gaining public support, politicians see this negativity as consistent with negative media bias, which increases their chances of securing media access and public attention.

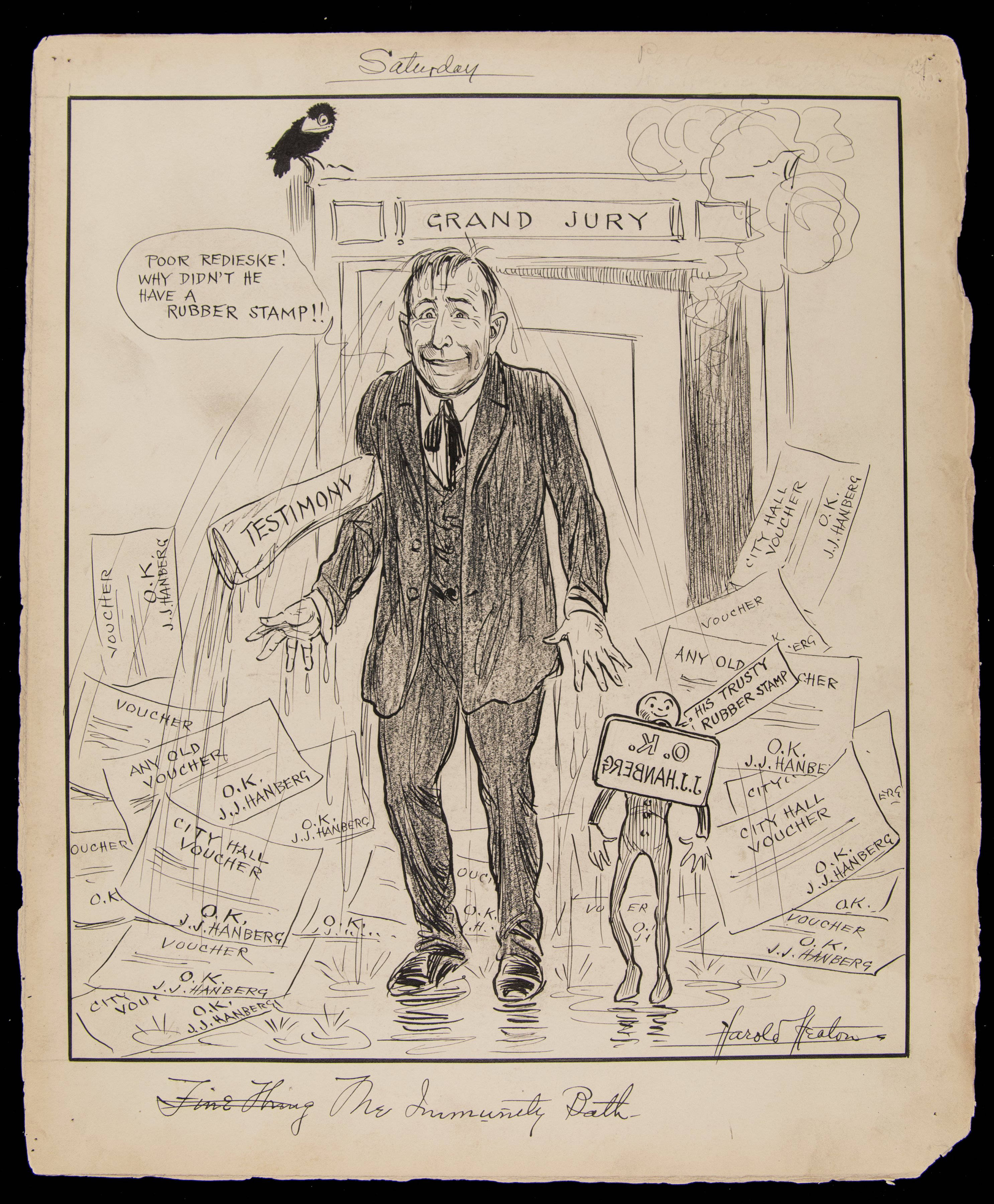
The Immunity Bath (J.J. Hanberg leaving the Grand Jury Room, surrounded by stamped vouchers), March 5, 1910

Also, lack of accountability and the immunity from prosecution they receive as politicians results in further corruption and evasion from legal punishment, as represented by the immunity bath depiction by J.J. Hanberg.

== See also ==
- Great man theory
- Independent politician
- Legislator
- Nomination rules
- Parliamentary immunity
- Political campaign
- Political party
- Political prisoner
- Term limit
  - List of political term limits
