= DACC =

DACC may refer to:

- Danville Area Community College
- Detroit Animal Care and Control
- County of Los Angeles Department of Animal Care and Control
