= Zvi Safra =

Israeli British economist

- צבי ספרא
- Born: March 8, 1952 (age 74); Jerusalem, Israel
- Citizenship: Israel and United Kingdom
- Education: The Hebrew University of Jerusalem
- Scientific career
- Fields: Economics
- Doctoral advisor: Menahem E. Yaari; Yves Balasko

Zvi Safra (Hebrew: צבי ספרא) is an Israeli and British economist and decision theorist. Safra is a professor at the Warwick Business School at the University of Warwick and an emeritus professor at the Coller School of Management at Tel Aviv University. Safra is an elected fellow of the Society for the Advancement of Economic Theory and was previously an editor at Economics & Philosophy. Safra was formerly a Vice-Chancellor at the Israeli College of Management Academic Studies.

== Academic career ==
Safra obtained his degrees in mathematics and economics from The Hebrew University of Jerusalem, including a Ph.D. under Menachem E. Yaari and Yves Balasko in 1983.

In that year, Safra was accepted as a Rothschild Foundation fellow, and was invited to stay as a post-doc at Harvard University. Upon his return to Israel, he joined as a faculty member at Tel Aviv University, where he remained until 2005. Over these years, he served as the head of the Ph.D. program at the Coller School of Management.

During 2006–2010, Safra served as the Vice Chancellor of the Israeli College of Management Academic Studies.

Safra moved to the University of Warwick in 2013 after serving two years as the head of the Ph.D. program at the University of Exeter Business School.

In 2020, Safra was selected as an Economic Theory Fellow by Society for the Advancement of Economic Theory.

== Research ==
Safra's body of work is in the fields of individual choice under risk and under uncertainty, bargaining, and social choice. His main contribution to decision theory is the rigorous analysis of the preference reversal phenomenon and the demonstration that for individuals who violate the independence axiom, the Becker, DeGroot and Marshack mechanism of utility elicitation may fail.

His contribution was cited hundreds of times, including by several Nobel prize winners in economics: Daniel Kahneman, Alvin Roth in his Handbook of Experimental Economics, Richard Thaler and Vernon Smith.

Other contributions to decision theory include the pioneering analysis of risk aversion in the rank-dependent model, the first analysis of auctions without expected utility, and the discovery that not only expected utility, but all known models of decision under risk are vulnerable to Matthew Rabin's calibration criticism.

His main contribution to bargaining theory is the extension of the axiomatic Nash bargaining solution to ordinal and non-expected utility preferences. His main contributions to social choice theory include an axiomatization of individual behavior that is motivated by an intrinsic sense of fairness, and an extension of Harsanyi's impartial observer model that can accommodate concerns for fairness and different individuals’ risk attitudes, and that yields the Prioritarian social welfare function as a special case.
