= Short-termism =

Excessive focus on short-term results

Short-termism is giving priority to immediate profit or reward, quickly executed projects and short-term results, over long term results and far-seeing action. Pope Francis opined that in business and politics, it can work to undermine actions where results take time to mature "... and demand immediate outlays which may not produce tangible effects within any one government's term".

BBC journalist Richard Fisher links short-termism to "a weakness in our thinking called present bias, which favours short-term payoffs over long-term rewards".

== See also ==
- Hyperbolic discounting
