= Economics & Philosophy =

- Discipline: Philosophy and economics
- Language: English
- Edited by: Zvi Safra, Itai Sher, Katie Steele, Peter Vanderschraaf

Publication details
- History: 1985–present
- Publisher: Cambridge University Press
- Frequency: Triannual
- Open access: Hybrid open-access journal
- Impact factor: 1.615 (2021)

Standard abbreviations
- ISO 4: Econ. Philos.

Indexing
- ISSN: 0266-2671 (print); 1474-0028 (web)
- LCCN: 85642423
- OCLC no.: 709983997

Links
- Journal homepage; Online access; Online archive

Economics & Philosophy is a triannual peer-reviewed academic journal covering different aspects of philosophy and economics. It was established in 1985 and is published by Cambridge University Press. The editors-in-chief are Zvi Safra (Warwick University), Itai Sher (University of Massachusetts), Katie Steele (Australian National University), and Peter Vanderschraaf (University of Arizona).

== Abstracting and indexing ==
The journal is abstracted and indexed in:

- Current Contents/Social and Behavioral Sciences
- EconLit
- Philosopher's Index
- ProQuest databases
- Scopus
- Social Sciences Citation Index

According to the Journal Citation Reports, the journal has a 2021 impact factor of 1.615.

== See also ==
- List of economics journals
- List of philosophy journals
