= Behavioral economics and public policy =

Behavioral economics and public policy is a field that investigates how the discipline of behavioral economics can be used to enhance the formation, implementation and evaluation of public policy. Using behavioral insights, it explores how to make policies more effective, efficient and humane by considering real-world human behavior and decision-making.

== Overview ==
Behavioral economics as a subfield of economics is a fairly recent development and the implications of it for public policy have yet to be systematically explored. Behavioral economists have accumulated extensive findings indicating, contrary to standard economic assumptions, that people do not act rationally, that they are not perfectly self-interested, and that they hold inconsistent preferences. These deviations from the standard assumptions about behavior have become increasingly more important for economic policy in recent years. In the book Policy and Choice: Public Finance through the Lens of Behavioral Economics economists William J. Congdon, Jeffrey R. Kling and Sendhil Mullainathan argue that though traditional public finance provides a comprehensive framework for policy analysis, insights from behavioral economics can be applied to questions of economic policy, such as tax policy, pension systems, health policy, and other government interventions.

== Behavioral insights in public policy ==
=== Taxation ===
Traditional public finance has a well-developed framework for determining how to set taxes optimally. One broad insight is that efficient taxes are those that minimally distort consumer choices, because a change in choices resulting from taxation represents a welfare cost. Behavioral economics complicates this logic.

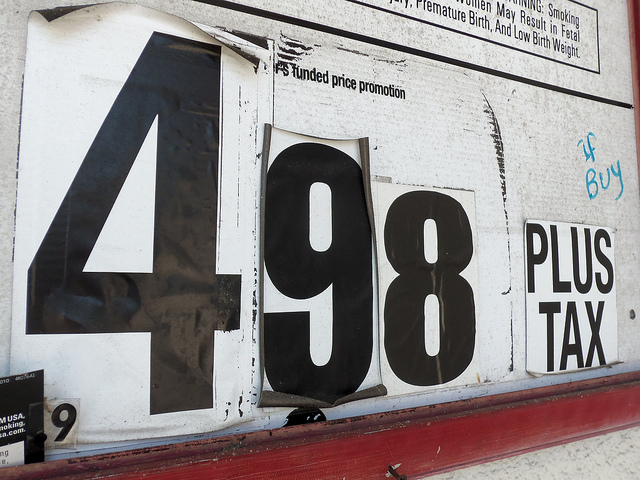
Tax salience

The behavioral concept of "tax salience" refers to the visibility of the tax-inclusive price and how the way taxes are displayed can influence consumer behavior. It emphasizes that people are more likely to change their behavior in response to highly visible and highly salient taxes. Commodity taxes that are included in the posted prices that consumers see when shopping have larger effects on demand. On the other hand, individuals may fail to attend to sales taxes that are not included in the prices on store shelves but are computed at the register (such as in the United States) – they are not salient at the time of choice.

Tax non-salience should represent an opportunity for governments of raising revenues without distorting behavior. But the lack of response to a non-salient tax is not the same as lack of response to a salient tax. It means that consumers make choices as if an item costs $X, but in reality they spend $X + $Y. As a result, they have $Y less to spend in the future than they had planned. If the lost money is treated as a pure income effect (individuals see that they have $Y less to spend on all other goods and adjust), then that would turn the non-salient tax into a lump-sum tax and governments should use non-salient taxes heavily. But rather than thinking of their overall budget as depleted by $Y, individuals could also think of $Y as depleting their grocery budget specifically, and they may spend $Y less during their next shopping. Or they may never change consumption and instead end up saving less. In such cases, the low demand response to non-salient taxes is misleading: though it does not generate distortions in the demand for the good being taxed, it is creating possibly higher distortions elsewhere. So governments would need to take into account other potential demand responses before using non-salient taxes.

=== Retirement savings and pension systems ===
Old-age insurance and savings policies can help to ensure adequate levels of consumption in old age by assisting individuals with accumulating adequate wealth during their working years. A behavioral approach offers new perspectives on how to effectively accomplish that. Behavioral economics recognizes that individuals often have trouble saving and planning for their own retirement – they save too little, they invest in the wrong assets, etc. If low levels of saving are simply due to it being unattractive relative to consumption, then subsidization, such as through existing tax incentives, is sufficient. But if low levels reflect choice errors or a failure of self-control, subsidies may not be sufficient or necessary. The key implication is that if policy seeks to encourage more saving, it can do so by making it easier to save. In enrollment in retirement saving plans, behavioral economics has shown that default rules (actively enrolling or automatically enrolled, with the ability to opt out) can have substantial effects on participation and saving. Policies encouraging firms to automatically enroll their workers in 401(k) plans, rather than waiting for individuals to sign up on their own, seem to encourage participation and savings to an extent that is difficult to rationalize under standard assumptions about preference and choice. Alternatively, forcing individuals to choose or dramatically simplifying the enrollment process also increases participation and saving. Simplifying the process of opening and contributing to other types of retirement accounts, such as IRAs, could have similar effects.

To address that part of low saving that results from the difficulty that individuals can have in exerting self-control, policy might seek to aid individuals in committing to saving and make it harder for them to procrastinate or give in to short-term temptations. Policies can assist individuals with following through on their intentions through automatic enrollment and automatic escalation, which have been shown to be effective tools. Further, when individuals are tempted to use their retirement funds before they retire, policies can reduce the temptation through penalties and fees that are features of most existing tax-favored retirement savings plans. Policies can also seek to expand individuals' capacity to make good choices through education and efforts to promote financial literacy.

=== Health insurance ===
Public finance focuses on the possibility that unregulated markets for health insurance are susceptible to failure and inefficiency due to asymmetries of information that occur when some market participants have more complete information than others about relevant market features. One of them is adverse selection. Consumers have private information about their health status that insurers do not and the resulting selection effect in consumption can cause the market to unwind. Policymakers can encourage or even force risk pooling (insurance companies coming together to form one) through regulating and subsidizing private insurance markets, or they can provide fully public insurance. However, individuals may be imperfect optimizers or may hold non-standard preferences. Decision-making errors such as overconfidence, difficulty in evaluating risks and making judgments under uncertainty mean that the private information associated with health status may not necessarily translate into the sort of adverse selection predicted by the traditional model. Moreover, some behavioral tendencies that might mitigate adverse selection might also lead to decision-making errors that themselves lead to a loss of welfare. The net impact of behavioral tendencies on the market for health insurance is theoretically unclear. Therefore, the success or failure of policy responses to increase access to health insurance might depend on how the policies address issues related to individual choice.

Another asymmetry is moral hazard. While moral hazard suggests that people with insurance will overconsume drugs or doctor visits, self-control problems might deter individuals from doing so or even lead them to underconsume those services. In drawing conclusions about the social welfare implications of alternative policies for expanding health insurance, the costs associated with moral hazard must be considered in context rather than assumed to follow from behavior consistent with standard assumptions.

The policy response to adverse selection and moral hazard must consider the ways in which behavioral tendencies affect how those forces operate. One approach is to promote the function of private health insurance markets through a combination of subsidies that make health insurance more affordable and regulations that encourage pooling and discourage selection, both in group and nongroup health insurance markets. Another is to provide health insurance coverage directly through public programs, which can target vulnerable populations and can be explicitly designed to pool risks and avoid adverse selection. The psychology of targeted individuals plays an important but distinct role in the operation of each type of policy environment.

== List of further areas ==
- unemployment benefits (behavior under coverage that looks much like standard moral hazard may be a result of behavioral tendencies such as failure of self-control or reference-dependent preferences).
- education (more immediate incentives, short-run, salient incentives)
- environmental policy (short-run, salient incentives, clear messages)
- provision of public goods (policy can foster conditions under which individuals will provide or contribute to public goods on a voluntary basis)
- poverty and inequality (moral hazard, distinguishing properly who requires assistance)

== Future directions ==
In the future, behavioral economics has great potential to aid in the field of public policy. Psychological factors reshape core concepts in public finance and can be integrated into policy making and improve the outcomes of policies. However, further research is needed. For instance, resolving the net welfare consequences of tax salience is an important future line of research. The net impact of behavioral tendencies on the market for health insurance is theoretically unclear and also requires further study.
