= Cursed equilibrium =

Solution concept in Game Theory

- Solution concept in game theory

Relationship
- Superset of: Bayesian Nash equilibrium

Significance
- Proposed by: Erik Eyster, Matthew Rabin

In game theory, a cursed equilibrium is a solution concept for static games of incomplete information. It is a generalization of the usual Bayesian Nash equilibrium, allowing for players to underestimate the connection between other players' equilibrium actions and their types – that is, the behavioral bias of neglecting the link between what others know and what others do. Intuitively, in a cursed equilibrium players "average away" the information regarding other players' types' mixed strategies.

The solution concept was first introduced by Erik Eyster and Matthew Rabin in 2005, and has since become a canonical behavioral solution concept for Bayesian games in behavioral economics.

== Preliminaries ==
=== Bayesian games ===
Let $I$ be a finite set of players and for each $i \in I$, define $A_i$ their finite set of possible actions and $T_i$ as their finite set of possible types; the sets $A = \prod_{i \in I} A_i$ and $T = \prod_{i \in I} T_i$ are the sets of joint action and type profiles, respectively. Each player has a utility function $u_i : A \times T \rightarrow \mathbb R$, and types are distributed according to a joint probability distribution $p \in \Delta T$. A finite Bayesian game consists of the data $G = ((A_i, T_i, u_i)_{i \in I}, p)$.

=== Bayesian Nash equilibrium ===
For each player $i \in I$, a mixed strategy $\sigma_i : T_i \rightarrow \Delta A_i$ specifies the probability $\sigma_i ( a_i | t_i)$ of player $i$ playing action $a_i \in A_i$ when their type is $t_i \in T_i$.

For notational convenience, we also define the projections $A_{-i}= \prod_{j \neq i} A_j$ and $T_{-i} = \prod_{j \neq i} T_j$, and let $\sigma_{-i} : T_{-i} \rightarrow \prod_{j \neq i} \Delta A_j$ be the joint mixed strategy of players $j \neq i$, where $\sigma_{-i} (a_{-i} | t_{-i})$ gives the probability that players $j \neq i$ play action profile $a_{-i}$ when they are of type $t_{-i}$.

Definition: a Bayesian Nash equilibrium (BNE) for a finite Bayesian game $G = ((A_i, T_i, u_i)_{i \in I}, p)$ consists of a strategy profile $\sigma = (\sigma_i)_{i \in I}$ such that, for every $i \in I$, every $t_i \in T_i$, and every action $a_i^*$ played with positive probability $\sigma_i ( a_i^* | t_i) > 0$, we have

$$a_i^* \in \underset{a_i \in A_i}\operatorname{argmax} \sum_{t_{-i} \in T_{-i}} p_i(t_{-i} | t_i) \sum_{a_{-i} \in A_{-i}} \sigma_{-i} (a_{-i} | t_{-i}) u_i (a_i, a_{-i}, t_i, t_{-i})$$

where $p_i(t_{-i} | t_i) = \frac{p(t_i, t_{-i})}{\sum_{t_{-i} \in T_{-i}} p(t_{i} | t_{-i}) p(t_{-i}) }$ is player $i$'s beliefs about other players types $t_{-i}$ given his own type $t_i$.

== Definition ==
=== Average strategies ===
First, we define the "average strategy of other players", averaged over their types. Formally, for each $i \in I$ and each $t_i \in T_i$, we define $\overline{\sigma}_{-i} : T_i \rightarrow \prod_{j \neq i} \Delta A_{j}$ by putting

$$\overline{\sigma}_{-i} (a_{-i} | t_i)= \sum_{t_{-i} \in T_i} p_i(t_{-i} | t_i) \sigma_{-i} (a_{-i} | t_{-i})$$

Notice that $\overline{\sigma}_{-i} (a_{-i} | t_i)$ does not depend on $t_{-i}$. It gives the probability, viewed from the perspective of player $i$ when he is of type $t_i$, that the other players will play action profile $a_{-i}$ when they follow the mixed strategy $\sigma_{-i}$. More specifically, the information contained in $\overline{\sigma}_{-i}$ does not allow player $i$ to assess the direct relation between $a_{-i}$ and $t_{-i}$ given by $\sigma_{-i} (a_{-i} | t_{-i})$.

=== Cursed equilibrium ===
Given a degree of mispercetion $\chi \in [0, 1]$, we define a $\chi$-cursed equilibrium for a finite Bayesian game $G = ((A_i, T_i, u_i)_{i \in I}, p)$ as a strategy profile $\sigma = (\sigma_i)_{i \in I}$ such that, for every $i \in I$, every $t_i \in T_i$, we have

$$a_i^* \in \underset{a_i \in A_i}\operatorname{argmax} \sum_{t_{-i} \in T_{-i}} p_i(t_{-i} | t_i) \sum_{a_{-i} \in A_{-i}} \left[\chi \overline{\sigma}_{-i} (a_{-i} | t_i) + (1- \chi)\sigma_{-i} (a_{-i} | t_{-i}) \right] u_i (a_i, a_{-i}, t_i, t_{-i})$$

for every action $a_i^*$ played with positive probability $\sigma_i ( a_i^* | t_i) > 0$.

For $\chi = 0$, we have the usual BNE. For $\chi = 1$, the equilibrium is referred to as a fully cursed equilibrium, and the players in it as fully cursed.

== Applications ==
=== Trade with asymmetric information ===
In bilateral trade with two-sided asymmetric information, there are some scenarios where the BNE solution implies that no trade occurs, while there exist $\chi$-cursed equilibria where both parties choose to trade.

=== Ambiguous political campaigns and cursed voters ===
In an election model where candidates are policy-motivated, candidates who do not reveal their policy preferences would not be elected if voters are completely rational. In a BNE, voters would correctly infer that if a candidate is ambiguous about their policy position, then it's because such a position is unpopular. Therefore, unless a candidate has very extreme – unpopular – positions, they would announce their policy preferences.

If voters are cursed, however, they underestimate the connection between the non-announcement of policy position and the unpopularity of the policy. This leads to both moderate and extreme candidates concealing their policy preferences.
