= LA County Animal Care & Control =

Agency of the government of Los Angeles County

Los Angeles County Department of Animal Care and Control (DACC) is a department of the government of Los Angeles County that runs animal care services. The agency is headquartered in Long Beach, California.

43 municipalities in the county contract animal care services to this department. In addition, the department covers all unincorporated areas of the county, including those surrounded by or next to the City of Los Angeles. It also covers Thousand Oaks, California, located in Ventura County. Areas within the Los Angeles city limits are covered by Los Angeles Animal Services and not by the county department.

== History ==
In 2016 the agency opened an animal shelter in Palmdale. In 2023 two journalists for the Los Angeles Times wrote that the Palmdale facility "was touted [as a place] that would relieve overcrowding and reduce the number of dogs being euthanized at the nearby Lancaster shelter."

In 2021, the county department changed the animal surrender process so that persons trying to surrender animals may be diverted to assistance programs so they may either keep their animals or they may rehome animals through alternative means.

In 2023, the Lancaster and Palmdale shelters had higher dog euthanasia rates than those of other LAACC shelters and several municipal facilities in Los Angeles County. An LA Times investigation prompted the agency to examine its rules and to add space for dogs to shelters.

== Coverage area ==
In addition to unincorporated areas, the agency covers the following in Los Angeles County: Agoura Hills, Artesia, Bell, Calabasas, Carson, City of Industry, Compton, Cudahy, Culver City, Hidden Hills, Huntington Park, Inglewood, Irwindale, La Habra Heights, Lancaster, Lomita, Malibu, Maywood, Monterey Park, Newhall, Palmdale, Palos Verdes Estates, Redondo Beach, Rolling Hills, Rolling Hills Estates, Santa Clarita, Walnut, West Covina, West Hollywood, Westlake Village, and Whittier. In Ventura County, it covers Thousand Oaks.

== Shelters ==
North County

- Santa Clarita Valley/Castaic Animal Care Center
- Lancaster Animal Care Center
- Palmdale Animal Care Center

South County

- Baldwin Park Animal Care Center
- Downey Animal Care Center

West County

- Agoura Animal Care Center
- Carson/Gardena Animal Care Center - Physically located in Carson, and has a Gardena post office address.
