= Reference dependence =

Reference dependence is a central principle in prospect theory and behavioral economics generally. It holds that people evaluate outcomes and express preferences relative to an existing reference point, or status quo. It is related to loss aversion and the endowment effect.

In prospect theory it is appropriate to use the selected status quo to determine the reference point. However, depending on the particular research being conducted researchers have proven reference dependence from more than just well known brands and the status quo. The types of reference points used varies but studies have used individual goals, aspirations and social comparisons. Alternative reference points are used by researchers commonly in the school of psychology but present some challenges to the methodologies of studies. Measuring reference dependence in field studies and laboratory experiments presents challenges as reference point values are unique to individuals, they are highly malleable and can be predetermined based on life experiences. Reference dependence studies are commonly critiqued on the context in which they provoke responses and to the accuracies in measuring highly malleable reference points.

Reference points that appear to be random in nature can also influence the decision of the individual choice. Ariely et al. (2003) were able to show that when a random variable is assigned to an individual that they will use that as reference point for the pricing of items. Through a series of lottery and chance experiments, individuals were influenced in their pricing decisions based on a randomised reference point.

Multiple reference points can simultaneously manipulate the individuals perspective of an outcome. A gain in the value of a product relative to the reference point can become null as the individual compares at the same time to a reference point that decreases the value of the product.

== Example ==
An example of reference dependence can be cited as supposedly taking a friend to a movie theatre. It may have been a long time since the last visit to the particular theatre. Previously, the high quality of seats and decadent concession stand could have created a lasting impression. The friend who has a near identical preference of movie theatre but has never been to this particular theatre, would be shocked, upon arrival, to find that there is no longer the same concession stand and the products unique to the theatre have now changed to a cheaper and efficient system of self-service products. The seats could have become more worn and due to the age do not appear as luxurious. This trade off of price over luxury may be disappointing to one but the friend could be very satisfied by the efficiency and price point. An individual's utility function is impacted by their reference point. Reference dependence asserts a value onto a product that can be assigned with numerous differing attributes the value is measured by the deviation from a reference point or status quo, which is either a gain or a loss in value.

== Marathon Runners ==
In a large field study of marathon runners in 20 of the largest participated United States marathons Markle et al. tested setting non-status quo reference points to determine the effect of reference dependence on runners satisfaction. The study by Markle et al. demonstrated that the changing of goals as reference points shape the value they weighted on their marathon. The study used satisfaction as an alternative measure for the dependent variable. They examined the satisfaction pre and post marathon runners. They were able to find that with the more experienced marathon runners that time goals as a reference point was not the only comparison and that the most recent or best marathon was a reference point to measure the satisfaction. Previous performance in marathons was a contributing factor in satisfaction aiding in the evidence of the hypothesises presented by Larsen et al. on mixed emotions.
