= Alos =

Alos may refer to:

== People ==
- Aloş, a Turkish sculptor
- Alós, a surname
- Maria Alos (1973–2011), interdisciplinary artist

== Places ==
- Alos, Greece, an ancient city in Greece
- Alos, Ariège, a commune of France
- Alos, Tarn, a commune of France

== Other uses ==
- ALOS (health care), an initialism used in managed health care, meaning "average length of stay"
- Advanced Land Observation Satellite, a Japanese satellite

== See also ==
- Carlos Alós-Ferrer (born 1970), Spanish neuroeconomist, decision theorist, and game theorist
