= Gary Charness =

American economist

- Born: 3 February 1950; Chicago, IL
- Died: 17 May 2024 (aged 74)

Academic background
- Education: University of Michigan (BSc); University of California, Berkeley (PhD)

Academic work
- Discipline: Experimental Economics, Behavioral Economics
- Website: Information at IDEAS / RePEc

Gary Charness (February 3, 1950 – 17 May 2024) was Professor of Economics and the Director of the Experimental and Behavioral Economics Laboratory in the Department of Economics at the University of California, Santa Barbara. Charness was an economist and social scientist, specializing in experimental and behavioral work; at the time of his death he was ranked 3rd in the world by RePEc in the field of experimental economics and had published nearly 120 academic articles. Charness was a contributor to several areas of economic research, including social preferences, identity and group membership, communication and beliefs, behavioral interventions, group decision-making, social networks, gender, and individual decision-making. Gary was known for his youthful spirit throughout his career, inspiring and motivating researchers worldwide across various fields. Remarkably, he began his Ph.D. at the age of 40 and published his first paper at 50. Despite starting his academic journey later in life, Gary managed to publish around 100 papers between the ages of 50 and 70, establishing himself as one of the leading researchers in experimental economics. A centerpiece of his research has been to affect beneficial social outcomes in difficult economic environments. Charness's work has been discussed and published in The New York Times and Science, as well as other media outlets. Charness was married and had three children.

== Early life and education ==
Charness was born in Chicago into a middle-class Jewish family. His grandparents left the Ukraine and Lithuania in the 1910s for the U.S. He attended elementary school on the Near North Side until his family moved to Skokie in 1962. In his early years, he wished to be a scientist and a baseball player; these interests manifested in his becoming a social scientist in his 40s and playing competitive senior softball. He attended junior high school and high school in Skokie, finishing at the top of his class and receiving a National Merit Scholarship. Charness received his B.S. from the University of Michigan in 1971, having completed the Honors program in Mathematics. While this program was geared towards producing math professors, he decided against graduate school in favor of traveling the world and learning about people. After traveling through Europe and the Middle East, he returned to the U.S. in late 1972 and relocated to San Francisco where he pursued a diverse array of occupations.

In the span of 20 years, Charness pursued (among other activities) being a semi-professional poker player, an importer of textile art from Indonesia, an options trader on the Pacific Exchange, and a real-estate broker, investor, and lender.

== Career ==
In the fall of 1990, Charness read a newspaper article about a Stanford professor winning a Nobel Prize and knew one of the colleagues (Paul Milgrom) interviewed for the piece, as they were both students in the Honors Mathematics program at Michigan. This spurred him to apply to the economics Ph.D. program at Berkeley. He pushed his way into Berkeley, despite an initial rejection, and started the program in 1991.

At Berkeley, Charness learned about experiments being used for research and saw this as an extension of poker playing, given the intuition he developed about people in these two decades in the real world. He decided to pursue research in this area and conducted experiments at Berkeley and Tucson for his dissertation, under the tutelage of Matthew Rabin and George Akerlof. Charness's post Ph.D. career began with a visiting position at Pompeu Fabra in Barcelona in 1997. After commuting for three years between San Francisco and Barcelona (and floating free for another year), Gary accepted a position as an assistant professor at UCSB in 2001.

Within academia, Charness is known particularly for producing experimental designs to examine preferences, motivations, and incentives in economic settings. Work on social preferences (e.g., Charness and Rabin, 2002) has helped to delineate underlying preferences for social distribution and reciprocity. Work on cheap-talk communication (e.g., Charness, 2000, Charness and Dufwenberg, 2006, 2010, 2011, and Brandts, Charness, and Ellman, 2016) has illustrated when and how non-binding communication can be effective in achieving socially-optimal outcomes. His research on incentivizing exercise (Charness and Gneezy, 2009) has helped to lead to programs for improving physical fitness. Charness's research on social networks has highlighted the importance of exactly how people are connected in determining patterns of economic behavior. Charness, Feri, Melendez-Jimenez, and Sutter (2014) won the prestigious Exeter Prize in 2015, for the best paper published in the previous calendar year in a peer-reviewed journal in the fields of Experimental Economics, Behavioral Economics, and Decision Theory.

In addition to his research output (nearing 100 papers), Charness served on a number of editorial boards at highly ranked journals. This included an eight-year stint at the American Economic Review and more than seven years at Management Science. He was appointed as an Editor at Games and Economic Behavior in February 2016.

== Selected publications ==
Charness, Gary (2000), “Self-serving Cheap Talk and Credibility: A Test of Aumann’s Conjecture,” Games and Economic Behavior, 33, 177–194.

Charness, Gary and Matthew Rabin (2002), “Understanding Social Preferences with Simple Tests,” Quarterly Journal of Economics, 117, 817–869.

Charness, Gary and Ernan Haruvy (2002). Altruism, equity, and reciprocity in a gift-exchange experiment: an encompassing approach. Games and Economic Behavior, 40(2), 203-231.

Charness, Gary (2004), “Attribution and Reciprocity in an Experimental Labor Market,” Journal of Labor Economics, 22, 665–688.

Charness, Gary and Dan Levin (2005), “When Optimal Choices Feel Wrong: A Laboratory Study of Bayesian Updating, Complexity, and Affect,” American Economic Review, 95, 1300–1309.

Charness, Gary and Martin Dufwenberg (2006), “Promises and Partnership,” Econometrica, 74, 1579–1601.

Charness, Gary, Ernan Haruvy and Doron Sonsino (2007). Social distance and reciprocity: An Internet experiment. Journal of economic behavior & organization, 63(1), 88-103.

Charness, Gary, Margarida Corominas-Bosch, and Guillaume Fréchette (2007), “Bargaining and Network Structure: An Experiment,” Journal of Economic Theory, 136, 28–65.

Charness, Gary, Luca Rigotti, and Aldo Rustichini (2007), “Individual Behavior and Group Membership,” American Economic Review, 97, 1340–1352.

Charness, Gary and Uri Gneezy (2009), “Incentives to Exercise,” Econometrica, 77, 909- 931.

Charness, Gary and Marie Claire Villeval (2009), “Cooperation and Competition in Intergenerational Experiments in the Field and the Laboratory,” American Economic Review, 99, 956–978.

Charness, Gary and Martin Dufwenberg (2011), “Participation,” American Economic Review, 101, 1211–1237.

Brandts, Jordi and Gary Charness (2011), “The Strategy versus the Direct-response Method: A First Survey of Experimental Comparisons,” Experimental Economics, 14, 375–398.

Charness, Gary and Matthias Sutter (2012), “Groups make Better Self-Interested Decisions,” Journal of Economic Perspectives, 26, 157–176.

Charness, Gary, David Masclet, and Marie Claire Villeval (2014), “The Dark Side of Status,” Management Science, 60, 38-55)

Charness, Gary, Ramón Cobo-Reyes and Natalia Jiménez (2014), “Identities, Selection, and Contributions in a Public-goods Game,” Games and Economic Behavior, 87, 322–338.

Charness, Gary, Francesco Feri, Miguel Meléndez-Jiménez, and Matthias Sutter (2014), “Experimental Games on Networks: Underpinnings of Behavior and Equilibrium Selection,” Econometrica, 82, 1615–1670.

Charness, Gary and Arthur Schram (2015), “Inducing Norms in Laboratory Allocation Choices,” Management Science, 61, 1531–1546.

Babcock, Philip, Kelly Bedard, Gary Charness, John Hartman, and Heather Royer (2015),“Letting Down the Team? Evidence of Social Effects of Team Incentives,” Journal of the European Economic Association, 13, 841–870.

Charness, Gary and Ernst Fehr (2015), “From the Lab to the Real World” Science, 350(6260), 512–513.

Brandts, Jordi, Gary Charness, and Matthew Ellman (2016), “Let’s Talk: How Communication Affects Contract Design,” Journal of the European Economic Association.
