= Boris Maciejovsky =

Austrian behavioral scientist

- Born: Vienna, Austria
- Education: Marketing (Ph.D.); Psychology (Dr. rer. nat.)
- Alma mater: Massachusetts Institute of Technology; University of Vienna
- Scientific career
- Fields: Behavioral economics; Organizational decision-making
- Workplaces: University of California, Riverside; Imperial College London; London School of Economics; Max Planck Society; Humboldt University of Berlin
- Doctoral advisor: Erich Kirchler; Dan Ariely

Boris Maciejovsky is an Austrian behavioral scientist, and an Associate Professor of Management at the School of Business at the University of California, Riverside. He is also the founder and managing partner at Greenleaf Analytics LLC, a behavioral management consultancy. His research focuses on behavioral economics and organizational decision-making.

== Biography ==
Maciejovsky received his doctoral degree, studying the persistence of decision biases on experimental markets under the supervision of Erich Kirchler at the University of Vienna in 2000. In 2009, he completed his second PhD, in marketing, under the supervision of Dan Ariely at the Sloan School of Management at the Massachusetts Institute of Technology. Maciejovsky held academic appointments at the Humboldt-University of Berlin (2001), the Max Planck Institute of Economics (2001-2004), the London School of Economics (2007-2008), and Imperial College London (2008-2013), before accepting an appointment at the University of California, Riverside in 2013.

== Current work ==
Maciejovsky has published articles in peer-reviewed journals, including Management Science, Organization Science, Marketing Science, the Strategic Management Journal, the Journal of Personality and Social Psychology, as well as Organizational Behavior and Human Decision Processes. He has also given a TEDx talk on how loss aversion might improve healthy eating habits. Maciejovsky's work has been funded by UK Research and Innovation and was awarded the 2014 Raymond S. Nickerson Prize by the American Psychological Association. Maciejovsky has also received the Golden Apple Teaching Award at the University of California, Riverside. In his current work, Maciejovsky is specifically interested in three major themes: (i) group decisions, learning, and knowledge transfer; (ii) information aggregation in social and organizational environments, and (iii) bargaining and negotiation. To study these areas, he mainly uses laboratory experiments with human participants and computer simulations. His regular collaborators include Dan Ariely, David Budescu, Werner Güth, Erich Kirchler, Markus Reitzig, and Birger Wernerfelt.
