= San Diego Public Library =

Public library system in San Diego, CA

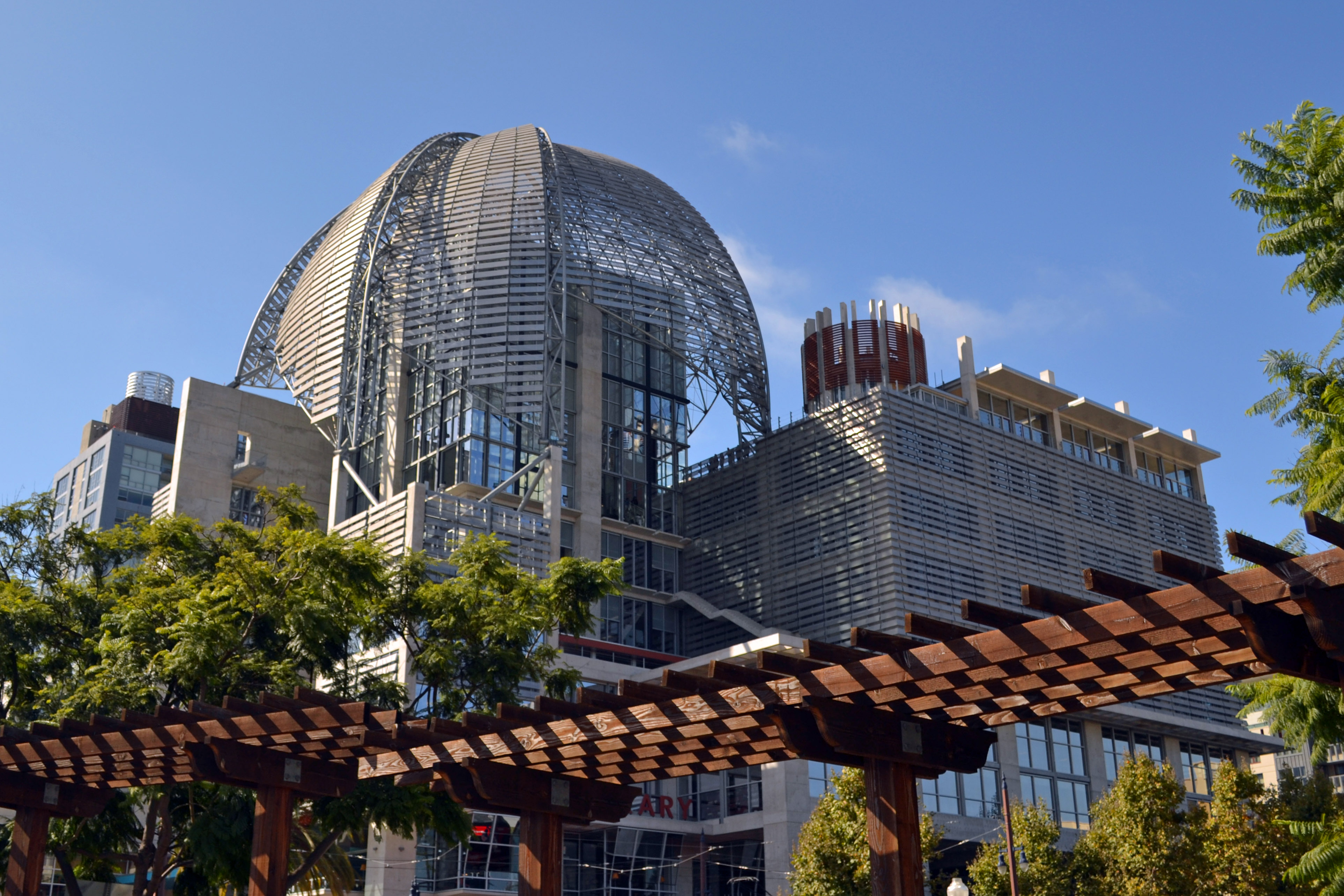
- Central Library
- Established: 1882
- Branches: 37

Access and use
- Circulation: 7.2 million
- Population served: 1.3 million

Other information
- Director: Misty Jones
- Website: Official website

The San Diego Public Library is a public library system serving San Diego, California.

== History ==
The San Diego Public Library was established on May 19, 1882, by an elected board of library trustees, one of whom was civic leader and philanthropist George Marston. The first location was rented space in the Commercial Bank building at Fifth and G streets, and the new library opened its doors to the public for the first time on July 15, 1882. San Diego was the first city west of the Mississippi River to receive a Carnegie Library grant. The grant was received in 1899 and the library built in 1902. The library moved to Eighth and E streets where the new Carnegie Library was constructed.

A notable librarian during this period was Clara Estelle Breed (1906–1994), who served as children's librarian at the downtown branch and was appointed City Librarian in 1945, a post she held for 25 years. She founded numerous branch libraries and established the Serra Cooperative Library System, which allows users to borrow books from other libraries in San Diego and Imperial counties. She maintained contact with many Japanese American children when they were interned with their families during World War II; her correspondence with those children is now on display at the Japanese American National Museum in Los Angeles.

In 2021, San Diego Library published its first children's book titled "Odi's Library Day" written by Hunter Hackett and illustrated by Anisi Baigude. Youth Services Librarian Emily Derry was responsible for introducing the concept of a published book to the library and brought the author and illustrator onto the project. The bilingual book is centered around the mascot for the San Diego Public Library system, Odi the Coyote, visiting the San Diego Central Library. Odi was named after the vision statement of the library, with each letter standing for opportunity, discovery, and inspiration.

Since the construction of the Carnegie Library, there have been 36 branch libraries opened throughout the city.

=== Central Library ===
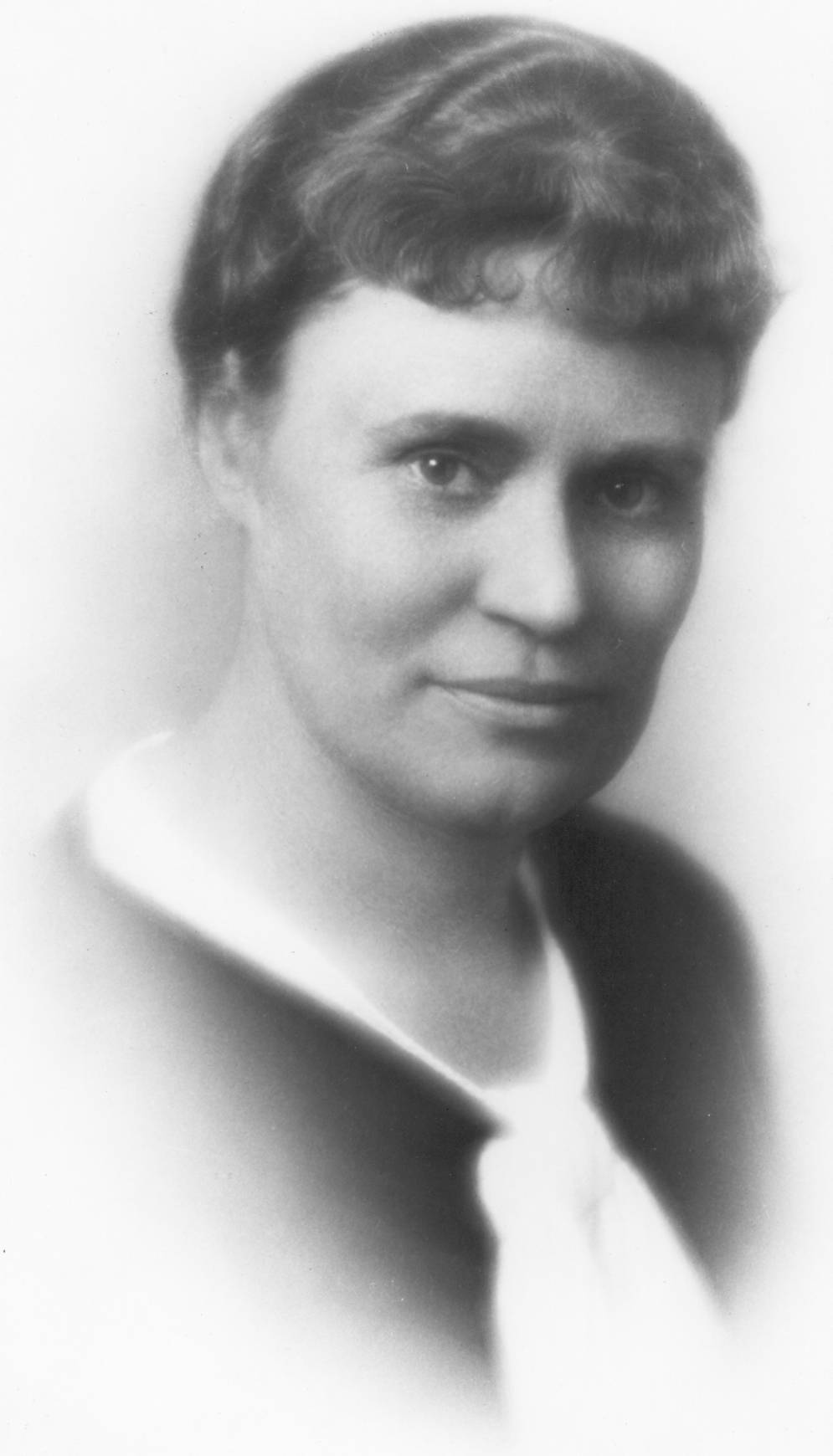
Althea Warren, San Diego Public Library's first professionally trained librarian

In 1952, the Carnegie Library was demolished and a new Central Library was opened at the same location on June 27, 1954. That library closed permanently on June 9, 2013, to begin the 10-week process of transferring its 2.6-million-item collection to the new library.

In 2010, construction began on a new $184.9 million 366,673 square feet (34,065.0 m^{2}) Central Library at 330 Park Boulevard in downtown San Diego. This 9-story structure was designed by San Diego architect Rob Quigley. The building includes bay view terraces, roof gardens, a public reading room, an auditorium, and an art gallery. It opened on September 30, 2013. The library displays numerous books and collections, including the second largest collection of baseball memorabilia in the U.S. The collection is housed in the Sullivan Family Baseball Research Center. Nearly 300 public art pieces are displayed throughout the library.

The Central Library also houses a new charter high school, e3 Civic High School, which is billed as the only school in the United States to be housed within a library. The school serves grades 9 through 12. It opened on September 3, 2013, with an initial student body of 260 ninth and tenth graders. Additional grades were added in 2014 and 2015 resulting in a student body of approximately 500.

== Services ==
The San Diego Public Library system currently consists of the Central Library, 36 branch libraries, and an adult literacy program office (READ/San Diego). Library cards are free to applicants who reside within the state of California or own property in the city of San Diego, and to men and women serving in the armed forces who are stationed within San Diego County. Library cards are permanent and must be renewed every year. There is a $30 annual fee for a non-resident library card.

In October 2023, in honor of Banned Books Week, the San Diego Public Library partnered with Library Foundation SD and Books Unbanned to provide free digital library cards to anyone aged 12–26 in the United States, becoming the fifth library to do so. Unlike other programs, this collection focuses on banned and restricted books, as opposed to the entire collection.

On the third floor of the Central Library is the new Innovation Lab that was originally funded by a state Library Services and Technology Act grant in 2013, when the Central Library opened. Since then, thanks to donations from the community, the lab has expanded and added additional machines. The new space was funded in part by the California State Library. Available equipment and resources from the Innovation Lab include:

- 3D Printing & Scanning
- Silhouette Cameos/Vinyl Cutter
- Sewing & Embroidery Machines
- Milling Machine
- Laser Cutter
- Computers
- Maker Classes & Workshop

In fiscal year 2006, the Library system had a circulation of more than 7 million and more than 6 million visits by patrons. The San Diego Public Library was one of the first major library systems in the United States to offer free wireless Internet access at all of its locations, including the Central Library and branch libraries.

While testing the Spirit of St. Louis airplane in San Diego, Charles Lindbergh used the resources at the San Diego Public Library to plot the course for his historic solo flight across the Atlantic Ocean.

Renowned American sculptor Donal Hord bequeathed to the San Diego Public Library his lifelong collection of books and several sculptures in appreciation for the assistance he had received from library's staff over the years.

== Branches ==
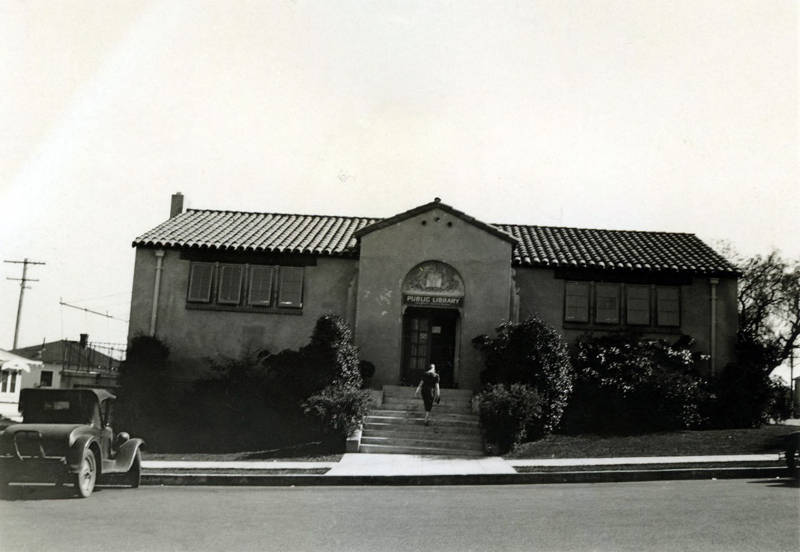
Picture of the University Branch Library taken in 1914, which later on became the Normal Heights Library

Aside from the Central Library, the system includes the following 36 branches:

	Name	Address	Neighborhood	Current building opened	Notes
1	Allied Gardens/Benjamin Library	5188 Zion Avenue	Allied Gardens	1965	Opening funded by Edwin A. Benjamin. Expanded in 1986.
2	Balboa Library	4255 Mt. Abernathy Avenue	Clairemont	1971	Initially named Mesa Vista Library.
3	Carmel Mountain Ranch Library	12095 World Trade Drive	Carmel Mountain Ranch	1997	Offers two meeting rooms and a Friends of the Library book store.
4	Carmel Valley Library	3919 Townsgate Drive	Carmel Valley	1993	Designed by Rusty Coombs, includes and displays a collection of public art.
5	City Heights/Weingart Library	3795 Fairmount Avenue	City Heights	1998	The library is next to the Performance Annex, a black box theater.
6	Clairemont Library	2920 Burgener Boulevard	Clairemont	1958	The thirteenth branch opened.
7	College-Rolando Library	6600 Montezuma Road	College Area	2005	Replaced the College Heights library built in 1955.
8	Kensington-Normal Heights Library	4121 Adams Avenue	Kensington	1937	Remodeled in 1962. It is currently the smallest of the branch libraries.
9	La Jolla/Riford Library	7555 Draper Avenue	La Jolla	1989	In September 2015, the creation and opening of its Bio Lab made it the first public library in the world to house a biotech lab.
10	Linda Vista Library	2160 Ulric Street	Linda Vista	1987	
11	Logan Heights Library	567 S. 28th Street	Logan Heights	2009	
12	Mira Mesa Library	8405 New Salem Street	Mira Mesa	1994	
13	Mission Hills-Hillcrest/Harley & Bessie Knox Library	215 W. Washington Street	Mission Hills and Hillcrest	2019	
14	Mission Valley Library	2123 Fenton Parkway	Mission Valley	2002	
15	Mountain View/Beckwourth Library	721 San Pasqual Street	Mountain View	1976	
16	North Clairemont	4616 Clairemont Drive	Clairemont	1962	
17	North Park Library	3795 31st Street	North Park	1959	
18	North University Community Library	8820 Judicial Drive	University City	2007	
19	Oak Park Library	2802 54th Street	Oak Park	1969	
20	Ocean Beach Library	4801 Santa Monica Avenue	Ocean Beach	1928	
21	Otay Mesa-Nestor Library	3003 Coronado Avenue	Otay Mesa	1986	
22	Pacific Beach/Taylor Library	4275 Cass Street	Pacific Beach	1997	
23	Pacific Highlands Ranch Library	12911 Pacific Place	Pacific Highlands Ranch	2024	
24	Paradise Hills Library	5922 Rancho Hills Drive	Paradise Hills	1964	
25	Point Loma/Hervey Library	3701 Voltaire Street	Point Loma	2003	
26	Rancho Bernardo Library	17110 Bernardo Center Drive	Rancho Bernardo	1996	
27	Rancho Peñasquitos Library	13330 Salmon River Road	Rancho Peñasquitos	1992	
28	San Carlos Library	7265 Jackson Drive	San Carlos	1974	
29	San Ysidro Library	4235 Beyer Boulevard	San Ysidro	2019	
30	Scripps Miramar Ranch Library	10301 Scripps Lake Drive	Scripps Ranch	1993	
31	Serra Mesa-Kearny Mesa Library	9005 Aero Drive	Serra Mesa and Kearny Mesa	2006	
32	Skyline Hills Library	7900 Paradise Valley Road	Southeast San Diego	2016	
33	Tierrasanta Library	4985 La Cuenta Drive	Tierrasanta	1984	
34	University Community Library	4155 Governor Drive	University City	1978	
35	University Heights Library	4193 Park Boulevard	University Heights	1966	
36	Valencia Park/Malcolm X Branch Library & Performing Arts Center	5148 Market Street	Southeast San Diego	1996	

== See also ==
- Althea Warren, head librarian, 1916–26
