= David Leiser =

Israeli cognitive psychologist and polymath

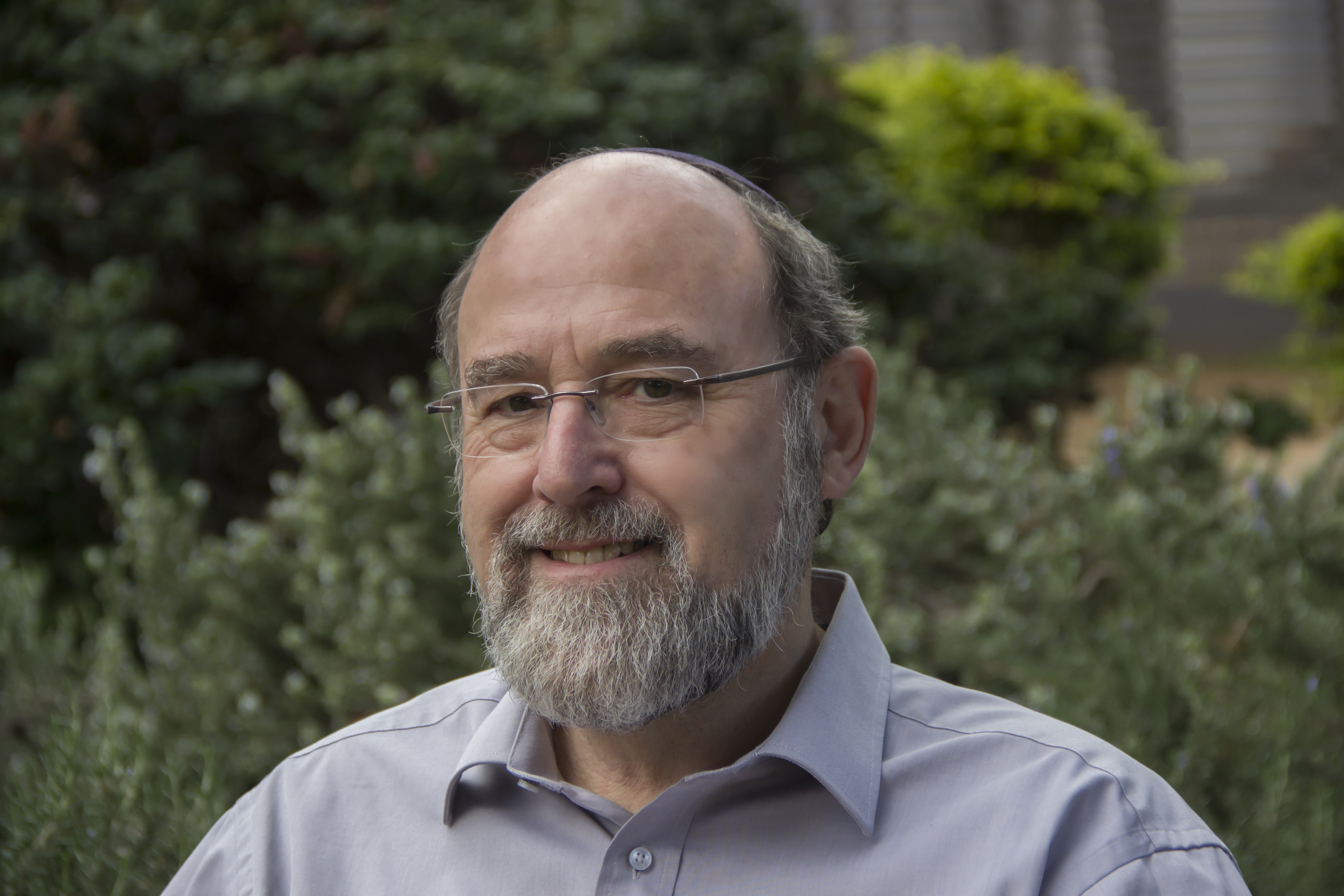
David Leiser

David Leiser (Hebrew: דויד לייזר; born April 1, 1952) is an Israeli cognitive psychologist, polymath, and Professor Emeritus at Ben-Gurion University of the Negev. A former research assistant to Jean Piaget. His research explores the "lay theories" people use to navigate complex systems—ranging from macroeconomics and geopolitical forecasting to Artificial Intelligence.

Leiser has served as President of the Economic Psychology division of the International Association of Applied Psychology (IAAP) and was president of the International Association for Research in Economic Psychology (IAREP) from 2011 to 2014.

== Biography and Education ==
David Leiser was born in Antwerp, Belgium. A polyglot, he is conversant in eight languages: French, Hebrew, English, Flemish, Yiddish, German, Latin, and Italian.

He earned his B.Sc. in Mathematics at The Hebrew University of Jerusalem (1972), followed by an MSc at the University of Illinois at Urbana-Champaign (1973). He completed his doctorate in psychology at the University of Geneva (1978) under the mentorship of Jean Piaget, where he served as a Research Assistant. This formative period established his focus on the "internal organization" of knowledge and genetic epistemology.

== Academic career ==
Following his doctorate, Leiser held a research position at the Max Planck Institute for Psycholinguistics in Nijmegen, Netherlands (1978–1979). He joined the faculty of Ben-Gurion University of the Negev in 1979, where he was appointed full professor in 2008. His career is marked by a global research footprint, holding prestigious visiting positions and sabbaticals at:

- MIT (1986–1987)
- University of Chicago (1976–1977)
- Yale University and Harvard University (2007)
- Paris II (Panthéon-Assas) (2017) — recognized as France's premier institution for economics and law.
- Paris V (René Descartes) (1993–1994)

At BGU, he founded the Center for Research on Pension, Insurance, and Economic Psychology (PIF) and has been a central figure in academic outreach to the Haredi community.

== Research and contributions ==
=== Cognitive Mapping and Developmental Foundations ===
Leiser’s early research applied Genevan structuralism to spatial and cultural concepts. His 1989 study on cognitive maps in Israel is a foundational text in environmental psychology. He also explored the construction of knowledge in children, such as the synthesis of astronomical and biological concepts regarding "birthdays."

=== Economic Psychology and "Causal Clusters" ===
In How We Misunderstand Economics and Why It Matters (2018), Leiser argues that the human brain relies on "Causal Clusters"—simplified, narrative-driven mental models—to navigate macroeconomics, for which it lacks an evolutionary endowment. This leads to systematic misunderstandings of systemic feedback and equilibrium.

=== Forecasting and the "Cassandra" Problem ===
In the 2020s, Leiser's research expanded into predictive intelligence. In the Journal of Personality and Social Psychology (2025), he investigated the "Cassandra" phenomenon: the psychological barriers that prevent accurate geopolitical forecasts from being utilized by decision-makers.

=== AI and Cognitive Epistemology ===
Leiser’s current work addresses the "epistemic impasse" in Artificial Intelligence. Drawing on genetic epistemology, he argues that while Large Language Models (LLMs) achieve associative plausibility, they lack the structural "internal organization" and logical necessity inherent in human cognitive architecture.

== Selected publications ==
- Leiser, D.; Shemesh, Y. (2018). How We Misunderstand Economics and Why It Matters. Routledge.
- Leiser, D.; Gillièron, C. (1990). Cognitive Science and Genetic Epistemology: A Case Study of Understanding. Plenum Press.
- Leiser, D. (2025). "Do People Listen to Cassandra? Persuasion and Accuracy in Geopolitical Forecasts". Journal of Personality and Social Psychology. doi:10.1177/01461672251375500.
- Leiser, D. (2024). "Improving geopolitical forecasts with 100 brains and one computer". International Journal of Forecasting. doi:10.1016/j.ijforecast.2023.01.008. hdl:10398/9d6d79db-bee0-4003-a2ed-59079ebea167.
