= Werner Güth =

German economist

- Born: 2 February 1944 (age 82); Rudolstadt, Thuringia, Germany

Academic background
- Education: University of Münster (MA 1970, PhD 1972 and Dr.Habil. 1976)
- Thesis: Kooperation in Marktwirtschaften: eine spieltheoretische Analyse der Koordinationsproblematik (1972)
- Doctoral advisor: Jochen Schumann

Academic work
- Discipline: Experimental economics, Game theory, Decision theory, Behavioral economics
- Institutions: Max Planck Institute for Research on Collective Goods (2015-present); Max Planck Institute of Economics (2001-2014); Humboldt University of Berlin (1994-2001); Goethe University Frankfurt (1986-1994); University of Cologne (1977-1986)
- Notable ideas: Ultimatum game
- Website: Information at IDEAS / RePEc

Werner Güth (born 2 February 1944) is a German economist who, together with Rolf Schmittberger and Bernd Schwarze, first described the ultimatum game. He is currently Emeritus Director at the Max Planck Institute for Research on Collective Goods.

== Biography ==
Güth was born on 2 February 1944 in Rudolstadt, Thuringia, Germany. He obtained his MA in Economics and PhD from the University of Münster in 1970 and 1972, respectively, and completed his habilitation in 1976. He worked as Professor in Economic Theory at the University of Cologne from 1977 to 1986, the Goethe University Frankfurt from 1986 to 1994 and the Humboldt University of Berlin from 1994 to 2001 before becoming Director and Scientific Member of the Max Planck Institute of Economics from 2001 to 2014 and an Emeritus Director at the Max Planck Institute for Research on Collective Goods. He was President of the International Association for Research in Economic Psychology (IAREP) from 1995 to 1997. Güth has also been Honorary Professor of Economics at the University of Jena since 2002 and received honorary doctorates from the University of Tübingen and the University of Karlsruhe in 2010.

His research interests include experimental economics, game theory, decision theory and behavioral economics. His regular collaborators include Reinhard Selten, Amnon Rapoport, Martin Kocher, Uri Gneezy, and Boris Maciejovsky.

== Selected publications ==
- Güth, W.; Schmittberger, R. & B. Schwarze (1982). "An Experimental Analysis of Ultimatum Bargaining". Journal of Economic Behavior and Organization, 3, pp. 367–388.
- Güth, W. & M. Yaari (1992). "An Evolutionary Approach to Explain Reciprocal Behavior in a Simple Strategic Game". In U. Witt. Explaining Process and Change – Approaches to Evolutionary Economics. Ann Arbor. pp. 23–34.
- Güth, W. & H. Kliemt (2000). "Evolutionarily Stable Co-operative Commitments". Theory and Decision, 49 (3), pp. 197–221.

== Publications about Güth ==
- van Damme, E.; Binmore, K. G.; Roth, A. E.; Samuelson, L.; Winter, E.; Bolton, G. E.; Ockenfels, A.; Dufwenberg, M.; Kirchsteiger, G.; Gneezy, U.; Kocher, M. G.; Sutter, M.; Sanfey, A. G.; Kliemt, H.; Selten, R.; Nagel, R. & O. H. Azar (2014). "How Werner Güth's ultimatum game shaped our understanding of social behavior". Journal of Economic Behavior and Organization, 108, pp. 292–318.

== See also ==
- Ultimatum game
