= Marie Claire Villeval =

French economist

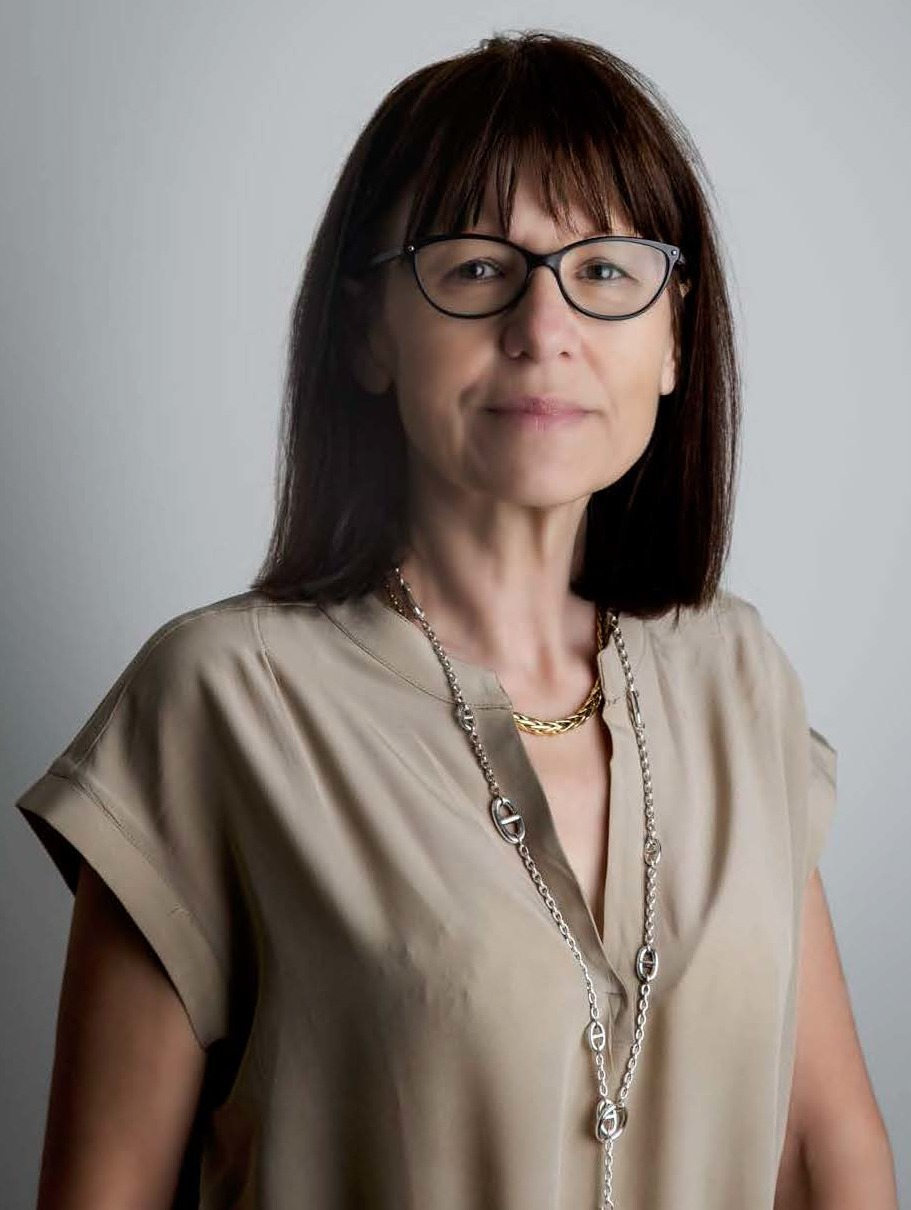
- Born: 26 June 1957 (age 69)
- Education: Paris-Nanterre University, Nancy II University
- Awards: Knight of the Ordre National du Mérite, 2012 Silver Medal of CNRS, 2017 Knight of the Légion d'honneur, 2017

Marie Claire Odile Villeval (born 26 June 1957) is a French economist and research professor in economics at the National Center for Scientific Research.

== Education ==
Marie Claire Villeval obtained her PhD in economics from the Paris-Nanterre University in 1982 and her Habilitation from the University of Lyon in 1998.

== Career ==
She is research professor in economics at the National Center for Scientific Research (CNRS) and she is affiliated with the Groupe d’Analyse et de Théorie Economique (GATE) research institute, at the University of Lyon, France. She has been the director of GATE from 2007 to 2016 and is now director of the GATE-Lab experimental platform http://gatelab.gate.cnrs.fr/. She is also affiliated with the Institute of Labor Economics (IZA), Bonn, Germany. She is a member of the CORTEX Laboratory of Excellence, selected in the framework of the Investissements d'Avenir program. She has been nominated at the Group of Experts on the minimum wage attached to the Prime Minister office.

She is Knight of the Légion d'Honneur and Knight of the Ordre National du Mérite and a member of the Academia Europaea. In 2017 she has been awarded the Silver Medal of CNRS, a prestigious distinction in France. In 2018, she has been awarded the revue Economique Prize. She is Fellow of the European Association of Labour Economists (EALE).

Her main research interests focus on experimental economics, behavioral economics, public economics and personnel economics. They include the conduct of laboratory and field experiments on moral norms and social norms, cheating and tax evasion, incentives and motivation, punishment and cooperation, status seeking, and emotions.

She is president of the Economic Science Association (ESA); she was previously vice-president of ESA for Europe. She was the president of the French Economic Association (AFSE) (2010-2011) and the Founding President of the French Association of Experimental Economics (ASFEE). She has been the treasurer and then the chairperson of the nomination committee of the European Association of Labour Economists (EALE) during ten years, and she is now a member of its executive committee.

She is an advisory editor of Experimental Economics after being a co-editor in chief of the journal. She is on the editorial boards of the Journal of the Economic Science Association, the Journal of Neurosciences, Psychology and Economics, and the Review of Behavioral Economics. She was formerly co-editor of the Journal of Economic Behavior and Organization (2014-2016) and she was on the boards of Management Science, the Journal of Economic Psychology, the Journal of Public Economic Theory, and the Australian Journal of Labour Economics.

She is the second most quoted French female economist, according to the IDEAS ranking. Her research has been covered by The Atlantic.

== Publications ==
She has published in such economic journals as The American Economic Review, Management Science, The Economic Journal, Experimental Economics, Games and Economic Behavior, Journal of Labor Economics, Journal of Public Economics, Journal of Economic Behavior and Organization, among others. She has published papers in PNAS and comments in Science and Nature. She has recently published a book on the behavioral economics of the labor market: L'économie comportementale du marché du travail, Presses de Sciences Po (2016).

== Awards ==
- 2012: National Order of Merit (France)
- 2016: Fellow of the European Association of Labour Economists
- 2017: Silver Medal of CNRS
- 2017: Knight of the Legion of Honor
- 2018: Prix Revue Economique
- 2018: Fellow of the European Association of Labour Economists
