= International Association for Research in Economic Psychology =

Interdisciplinary learned society

The International Association for Research in Economic Psychology, usually abbreviated IAREP, is an interdisciplinary learned society concerned with all areas in which the disciplines of economics and psychology overlap, including behavioural economics, experimental economics and decision making among others. As stated on their mission, IAREP is engaged in the advancement and dissemination of knowledge regarding economic psychology for the benefit of society by connecting people, data and ideas. It was founded in 1982, as a successor to an informal organization, the European Group for Research in Economic Psychology, which first met at Tilburg University (then known as the Katholieke Hogeschool Tilburg) in 1975. IAREP's membership has remained principally European; it works in close collaboration with the Society for the Advancement of Behavioral Economics (SABE), which is centred in North America. The different titles of the two organizations reflect the fact that one was founded mainly by psychologists, the other mostly by economists, but in practice their interests overlap greatly.

IAREP sponsors the Journal of Economic Psychology and elects its editors. It holds an annual conference (usually in Europe); the conference includes a lecture named in honour of Daniel Kahneman, who inaugurated the series himself at the IAREP/SABE conference in Paris in 2006. Many conferences are held in collaboration with SABE. IAREP conferences have played an acknowledged role as the starting point of several international research collaborations, for example a cross-national investigation of psychological attitudes to the euro before its introduction. They have also served as a reference point in discussing the state of interdisciplinary work between economics and psychology.

Past presidents of IAREP include Werner Güth, Erich Kirchler, David Leiser, Fred van Raaij and Paul Webley. The current president in office for the 2020–2022 term is Professor Gerrit Antonides.

Formally, IAREP is registered in the United Kingdom as a Company Limited by Guarantee.
