= Gerhard Reber =

German organizational theorist (1937–2023)

Gerhard Rudolf Reber (28 April 1937 – 7 December 2023) was a German organisational theorist and Professor of Management and Organizational Behavior of the Johannes Kepler University of Linz. He is known for work on leadership studies, and particularly for his early work on multidimensional organizations.

== Biography ==
After secondary education Reber completed a business internship at BASF, and in the early 1960s gathered more practical experience in the Wärtsilä corporations in Helsinki, and in the Canadian General Electric Company Ltd. in Toronto. Sequentially he graduated when studying business administration at the University of Mannheim with a thesis entitled "Refa-Arbeitsgestaltung und Refa-Entlohnung in leistungs-theoretischer Sicht" on work structuring.

In 1966 Reber obtained his MBA on a DAAD scholarship at the University of Toronto with a thesis on industrial relations. He continued his dissertation and habilitation on a research grant from the DFG and graduated in 1972 with the thesis entitled " Analyse entscheidungstheoretischer Ansätze - Auseinandersetzung mit Grundlagen des personalen Verhaltens im Betrieb" (Analysis of decision theory approach - dealing with basics of personal behavior during operations).

Reber started his academic career at the University of Mannheim, as Assistant professor under August Marx (1906-1990). In 1973 he moved to the Johannes Kepler University of Linz, where he served as Professor at the Department of Management until his retirement in 2005. He was co-founder and was later scientific director of Linz Management Academy. From 1977 to 1985 he was also Lecturer at the Federal School of Administration in Austria. Over the years Reber was Visiting Professor at universities in Vienna, Regensburg (as Chair-representation), Leipzig, Toronto, Atlanta and Dallas.

From 1976 to 2006 he was Associate Editor of Die Betriebswirtschaft. He received an honorary doctorate from the University of St. Gallen in 1991, from the Turku School of Economics in 2000, and from the N. I. Lobachevsky State University of Nizhny Novgorod.

Reber died on 7 December 2023, at the age of 86.

== Work ==
Reber's research focused on motivation, learning, groups, intercultural management and leadership. In 1975 he advocated a behavioral orientation of business administration and published "Wie rational verhält sich der Mensch im Betrieb? Ein Plädoyer für eine verhaltenswissenschaftliche Betriebswirtschaftslehre."

== Selected publications ==
- Reber, Gerhard. Die Arbeitsbewertung. Ein Gliederungs- und Rangproblem in schichtenpsychologischer und leistungstheoretischer Betrachtungsweise. PhD thesis, Mannheim 1965.
- Reber, Gerhard. Personales Verhalten im Betrieb. Poeschel, 1973.
- Reber, Gerhard. Wie rational verhält sich der Mensch im Betrieb? Ein Plädoyer für eine verhaltenswissenschaftliche Betriebswirtschaftslehre. Wien: Springer, 1975. ISBN 0-387-81353-5.
- Reber, Gerhard and Franz Strehl (Eds.). (1988). Matrix-Organisation: klassische Beiträge zu mehrdimensionalen Organisationsstrukturen. Poeschel.

Articles, a selection

- Reber, Gerhard. "Lernen, organisationales." Handwörterbuch der Organisation 3 (1992): 1240-1255.
- Brodbeck, F. C., Frese, M., Akerblom, S., Audia, G., Bakacsi, G., Bendova, H., ... & Wunderer, R. (2000). "Cultural variation of leadership prototypes across 22 European countries." Journal of occupational and organizational psychology, 73(1), 1-29.
- Szabo, E., Reber, G., Weibler, J., Brodbeck, F. C., & Wunderer, R. (2001). "Values and behavior orientation in leadership studies: Reflections based on findings in three German-speaking countries." The Leadership Quarterly, 12(2), 219-244.
- Szabo, E., Brodbeck, F. C., Den Hartog, D. N., Reber, G., Weibler, J., & Wunderer, R. (2002). "The Germanic Europe cluster: where employees have a voice." Journal of World Business, 37(1), 55-68.
