= Erich Kirchler =

Italian psychologist (born 1954)

Erich Kirchler (born 4 November 1954) is an Italian-Austrian psychologist and Professor of Economic Psychology at the University of Vienna.

His research covers the areas of work, organizational, consumer and economic psychology, in particular tax psychology and money management in private households. He is best known for his research on tax behavior and tax morale and his "slippery slope framework", which has been adopted by a number of tax administrations.

== Biography ==
Kirchler was born in Sand in Taufers in northern Italy. In 1974, he began studying architecture at the Technical University of Vienna and psychology and human anthropology at the University of Vienna. His doctoral dissertation focused on "Changes in concepts through learning processes – A contribution to cognitive dynamics" (German: Veränderung eines Begriffsraumes durch Lernprozesse – Ein Beitrag zur kognitiven Dynamik). After his graduation in 1979, he was employed at the University of Linz Institute of Education and Psychology. Under the supervision of Hermann Brandstätter, he received his habilitation in psychology in 1989 from the University of Linz, Austria. Since 1992, he has served as professor of applied psychology (economic psychology) at the Faculty of Psychology, University of Vienna, where he retired in 2020. Since 2010 he is also guest professor at the Vienna University of Economics and Business (as part of the DIBT: Doctoral Program in International Business Taxation).

Since 1992, Kirchler has taken on various administrative roles, first at the Institute of Psychology and afterwards at the Faculty of Psychology. He has served as Chair of the Department of Applied and Clinical Psychology, (Vice-) Chair of the Institute of Psychology and as Vice-Dean of the Faculty of Psychology. He was vice-chair and chair of the Department of Applied Psychology: Work, Education, Economy.

During his time in Vienna, he has received appointments for full professorships (C4) at the University of Erlangen-Nuremberg and the University of Cologne in Germany, and has also taught at several international universities as a visiting or guest professor. Besides being guest professor at the Vienna University of Economics (https://www.wu.ac.at/), since 2020, he is Senior Fellow at the IHS-Institute for Advanced Studies, Vienna (https://www.ihs.ac.at/).

He has served as a reviewer for Social Sciences at the Austrian Science Fund (FWF) for many years and has also been a member of the Austrian PR-Ethics Counsel. He has been President of the International Association for Research in Economic Psychology (IAREP), of the Austrian Society of Psychology (ÖGPs) and of Division 9 (Economic Psychology) of the International Association of Applied Psychology (IAAP). 2022 Research.com ranked him #536 on the Economists-list worldwide and #2 in Austria (https://research.com/scientists-rankings/economics-and-finance).

== Editorship ==
Together with Erik Hölzl (University of Cologne), Erich Kirchler was the editor of the Journal of Economic Psychology from 2010 to 2015. He is also co-editor of the International Taxation Research Paper Series and serves on the editorial boards of several journals and advisory boards. Together with Felix Brodbeck and Ralph Woschée, he has been the editor of the practical and scientifically founded book series "Die Wirtschaftspsychologie" ("The Economic Psychology") since 2014, which is aimed at students, practitioners, and university professors.

== Awards and prizes ==
- In 2006, Kirchler won the first "Hochschulmanagement-Preis" (Higher Education Management Prize) awarded by the Danube University Krems, together with Christiane Spiel, Alfred Schabmann and Christian Böck.
- 2022, 2023, 2024: Research.com-Ranking „economics and finance“ 2nd position in Austria and 536th position worldwide.
- 2018: Election "Fellow" of the International Association of Applied Psychology-IAAP https://iaapsy.org/
- 2024: "Honorary Member" of the International Association for Research in Economic Psychology-IAREP International Association for Research in Economic Psychology

== Selected bibliography ==
- Arbeitslosigkeit und Alltagsbefinden (in German). Linz: Trauner. 1984. ISBN 3-85320-323-X.
- Kaufentscheidungen im privaten Haushalt (in German). Göttingen: Hogrefe Verlag. 1989. ISBN 3-8017-0348-7.
- "Resigniert erstarren oder erfolgreich sein Schicksal schmieden? Determinanten der Wiederbeschäftigung von Arbeitslosen". Arbeitsmarktpolitik (in German). Linz: Österreichisches Institut für Arbeitsmarktpolitik. 1991.
- Arbeitslosigkeit. Psychologische Skizzen über ein anhaltendes Problem (in German). Göttingen: Hogrefe Verlag. 1993. ISBN 3-8017-0628-1.
- Kirchler E.; Rodler C.; Hölzl E.; Meier, K. (2000). Liebe, Geld und Alltag. Entscheidungen in engen Beziehungen (in German). Göttingen: Hogrefe Verlag. ISBN 3-8017-1359-8.
- Kirchler, E.; Rodler C., eds. (2002). "Motivation in Organisationen". Arbeits- und Organisationspsychologie (in German). Vienna. ISBN 3-85114-625-5.
- Rodler C.; Kirchler E., eds. (2002). "Führung in Organisationen". Arbeits- und Organisationspsychologie (in German). Vienna. ISBN 3-85114-626-3.
- Kirchler E.; Hölzl E., eds. (2002). "Arbeitsgestaltung in Organisationen". Arbeits- und Organisationspsychologie (in German). Vienna. ISBN 3-85114-627-1.
- Kirchler E.; Schrott A. (2002). "Entscheidungen in Organisationen". Arbeits- und Organisationspsychologie (in German). Vienna. ISBN 3-85114-629-8.
- Kirchler E.; Meier-Pesti K.; Hofmann E. (2004). "Menschenbilder in Organisationen". Arbeits- und Organisationspsychologie (in German). Vienna. ISBN 3-85114-628-X.
- The Economic Psychology of Tax Behaviour. Cambridge: Cambridge University Press. 2007. ISBN 978-0-521-87674-2.
- Kirchler E.; Walenta C. (2010). Motivation (in German). Vienna: Uni-Taschenbücher. ISBN 978-3-8252-3378-5.
- Walenta C.; Kirchler E. (2010). Führung (in German). Vienna: Uni-Taschenbücher. ISBN 978-3-7089-0641-6.
- Wirtschaftspsychologie: Individuen, Gruppen, Märkte, Staat (4 ed.). Göttingen: Hogrefe. 2011. ISBN 978-3-8017-2362-0.
- Kirchler E.; Hoelzl E. (2018). Economic Psychology: An Introduction. Cambridge: Cambridge University Press. ISBN 978-1-107-04050-2.
- Kirchler E.; Pitters J.; Kastlunger B. (2020). Psychologie in Zeiten der Krise: Eine wirtschaftspsychologische Analyse der Coronavirus-Pandemie. Heidelberg: Springer. ISBN 978-3-658-31270-1.
