= Paul Webley =

British academic

Paul Webley speaking at the Institute of Education

Paul Webley CBE (19 November 1953 – 2 March 2016) was director and principal of the School of Oriental and African Studies, University of London from 2006 to 2015. From 2010 until his death in 2016, he was Deputy Vice-Chancellor of the University of London. He was a member of the editorial board of the Journal of Economic Psychology and a former president of the International Association for Research in Economic Psychology.

Webley received his BSc and PhD from the London School of Economics. After a brief period at the University of Southampton, he moved to the University of Exeter, where he remained for 26 years, rising from lecturer to professor of economic psychology. He was head of the Department and School of Psychology from 1993 to 2003, and from 2003 to 2006, he was one of the university's deputy vice-chancellors (Senior Deputy VC, 2005-6). His major research interests were economic socialization, the psychology of money, and the psychology of taxation, though he also worked on environmental psychology and the general issue of the social psychology underlying rule compliance.

Webley was appointed Commander of the Order of the British Empire in the 2015 New Year Honours for services to higher education.

== Publications ==
Webley wrote 10 books, 58 chapters in books, 68 journal articles, and more than a dozen papers for newsletters, magazines, and miscellaneous professional and academic publications. A full list is available here:

- Publications

Notable publications, illustrating the range of Webley's research, include:

- Lea, S.E.G., Tarpy, R.M., & Webley, P. (1987). The Individual in the Economy. Cambridge: Cambridge University Press.
- Webley, P., Robben, H.S.J., Elffers, H., & Hessing, D.J. (1991). Tax evasion: an experimental approach. Cambridge: Cambridge University Press.
- Bonn, M.; Webley, Paul (2000). "South African children's understanding of money and banking". British Journal of Developmental Psychology. 18 (2): 269–278. doi:10.1348/026151000165689.
- Webley, P.; Siviter, C (2000). "Why do some owners allow their dogs to foul the pavement? The social psychology of a minor rule infraction". Journal of Applied Social Psychology. 30 (7): 1371–1380. doi:10.1111/j.1559-1816.2000.tb02525.x.
- Webley, P., Burgoyne, C.B., Lea, S.E.G. & Young, B.M. (2001). The Economic Psychology of Everyday Life. Hove: Psychology Press.
- Webley, Paul; Nyhus, E.K. (2001). "Life-cycle and dispositional routes into problem debt". British Journal of Psychology. 92 (3): 423–446. doi:10.1348/000712601162275.
- Webley, P.; Lewis, A.; Mackenzie, C.R. (2001). "Commitment among ethical investors: an experimental approach". Journal of Economic Psychology. 22: 27–42. doi:10.1016/S0167-4870(00)00035-0.
- Lea, S.E.G.; Webley, P. (2006). "Money as tool, money as drug". Behavioral and Brain Sciences. 29 (2): 161–209. doi:10.1017/s0140525x06009046. hdl:10036/34794. PMID 16606498. S2CID 2353982.

Academic offices
Preceded by Colin Bundy	Director of SOAS University of London; 2006–2015	Succeeded by Valerie Amos, Baroness Amos
