= Wolfgang Viechtbauer =

Statistician

- Education: Illinois State University (BS 1998); University of Illinois at Urbana–Champaign (MA 2002, MS 2003, PhD 2004)
- Awards: Olkin Award (Lifetime Achievement Award of the Society for Research Synthesis Methodology) 2019
- Scientific career
- Fields: Psychology, Statistics
- Workplaces: Maastricht University
- Thesis: Choosing between the fixed-, random-, and mixed-effects model in meta-analysis: an analysis of existing and new model selection methods (2004)
- Doctoral advisor: David Budescu
- Website: https://www.wvbauer.com/

Wolfgang Viechtbauer is a statistician. He is an associate professor of methodology and statistics at the Maastricht University in the Faculty of Health, Medicine and Life Sciences and Faculty of Psychology and Neuroscience. His most influential work has been focused on the field of meta-analysis and evidence synthesis.

== Education ==
Viechtbauer completed a M.A. (2002) and a Ph.D. (2004) at the University of Illinois at Urbana–Champaign. His master's thesis was titled Bias of certain variance estimators in meta-analysis and his dissertation was titled Choosing between the fixed-, random-, and mixed-effects model in meta-analysis: an analysis of existing and new model selection methods. His doctoral advisor was David Budescu.

== Career ==
Viechtbauer is an associate professor of methodology and statistics at the Maastricht University in the Faculty of Health, Medicine and Life Sciences and Faculty of Psychology and Neuroscience.

== Research and software ==
Viechtbauer’s research centres on statistical methods for meta-analysis, including heterogeneity estimation, publication-bias diagnostics and multilevel or multivariate models. In 2009 he released metafor, an R package that provides a comprehensive suite of functions for computing effect sizes, fitting fixed-, random- and mixed-effects models, and producing diagnostic graphics. The JSS article introducing metafor has received more than 18,000 citations in Google Scholar as of May 2025, and the software is referenced in methodological tutorials, and domain-specific guides across health, ecology, education and psychology.

== Selected works ==
- Roberts, Brent W.; Walton, Kate E.; Viechtbauer, Wolfgang (2006). "Patterns of mean-level change in personality traits across the life course: A meta-analysis of longitudinal studies". Psychological Bulletin. 132 (1): 1–25. doi:10.1037/0033-2909.132.1.1. ISSN 1939-1455. PMID 16435954.
- Viechtbauer, Wolfgang (2010). "Conducting Meta-Analyses in R with the metafor Package". Journal of Statistical Software. 36 (3). doi:10.18637/jss.v036.i03. ISSN 1548-7660.
- Viechtbauer, Wolfgang; Cheung, Mike W. L. (2010). "Outlier and influence diagnostics for meta-analysis". Research Synthesis Methods. 1 (2): 112–125. doi:10.1002/jrsm.11. PMID 26061377. S2CID 17573692.
