= Dan Friedman =

Dan Friedman is an American economist and academic known for his work in experimental and behavioral economics, market dynamics, and evolutionary approaches to economic theory. He is Distinguished Professor Emeritus of Economics at the University of California, Santa Cruz and also serves as Professor of Economics at the University of Essex. He is the co-winner of Exeter Prize and the Fellow of Society for the Advancement of Economic Theory. He also served as President of the Economic Science Association from 2019 to 2021.

== Education and career ==
Friedman earned his Ph.D. in mathematics from the University of California, Santa Cruz in 1977, where he was advised by mathematician Stephen Smale. He received his B.S. in mathematics from Reed College in 1969. After two years as Senior Financial Consultant at Bank of America headquarters, Friedman began his academic career as an assistant professor in the Department of Economics at the University of California, Los Angeles, where he served from 1979 to 1985. He then joined the faculty at the University of California, Santa Cruz in 1985 as an associate professor of economics, was promoted to Professor in 1989, and held the position until 2011, after which he became Distinguished Professor from 2011 to 2020.

Since 2020, he has held the title of Distinguished Professor Emeritus at UCSC. In parallel with his UCSC career, Friedman has served as Professor of Economics at the University of Essex since 2020. He founded and directed the LEEPS (Learning and Experimental Economics Projects) Laboratory at UCSC, which he led from 1986 to 2020, and also served as Chair of the UCSC Economics Department from 1998 to 2001.

== Research and scholarly works ==
Friedman's research spans applied economic theory, experimental economics, behavioral economics, financial markets, evolutionary game theory, and learning in economic systems. Friedman is the author and co-author of books in the field of experimental economics which include Experimental Methods: A Primer for Economists (1994), co-authored with Shyam Sunder and Economics Lab (2004), co-authored with Alessandra Cassar, which provides an intensive introduction to experimental economics.

His book Morals and Markets (2008;2013), written for a general audience, examines the evolution of human moral systems in early societies and the historical development of market systems.

His book Risky Curves (2014), co-authored with R. Mark Isaac, Duncan James, and Shyam Sunder, examines empirical violations of expected utility theory. He has also co-edited The Double Auction Market: Institutions, Theories and Evidence (1993) with John Rust.

== Honors and awards ==
- Inaugural Fellow of the Economic Science Association, 2024
- Fellow, Society for the Advancement of Economic Theory, 2011
- Exeter Prize (shared with R. Oprea) for Research in Experimental Economics, Decision Theory and Behavioral Economics, 2012.
- Martin M. Chemers Award 2008
- Royal Economic Society Prize for best 1996 paper published in The Economic Journal.
- President of the Economic Science Association, 2019–21.
