= Exeter Prize =

Academic Award

The Exeter Prize is an economics prize of the University of Exeter Business School, which has been awarded since 2012. The Exeter Prize is awarded to the best paper published in the previous calendar year in a peer-reviewed journal in the fields of Experimental Economics, Decision Theory and Behavioural Economics.

== Winners ==
- 2025: Tomas Jagelka for Jagelka, T. (2024) "Are Economists' Preferences Psychologists' Personality Traits? A Structural Approach", Journal of Political Economy, 132(3).
- 2024: Erin Bronchetti, Judd Kessler, Ellen Magenheim, Dmitry Taubinsky and Eric Zwick for Bronchetti, E. T., Kessler, J. B., Magenheim, E. B., Taubinsky, D., & Zwick, E. (2023). "Is attention produced optimally? theory and evidence from experiments with bandwidth enhancements." Econometrica, 91(2): 669–707.
- 2023: Kirby Nielsen and John Rehbeck for Nielsen, K., & Rehbeck, J. (2022). "When Choices are Mistakes." American Economic Review. 112 (7): 2237–2268.
- 2022: Sandro Ambuehl, Douglas Bernheim and Axel Ockenfels for Ambuehl, S., Bernheim, B. D., & Ockenfels, A. (2021). "What Motivates Paternalism? An Experimental Study." American Economic Review. 111 (3): 787-830.
- 2021: Ryan Oprea for Oprea, Ryan (2020). "What Makes a Rule Complex?". American Economic Review. 110 (12): 3913–3951. doi:10.1257/aer.20191717
- 2020: J. Aislinn Bohren, Alex Imas and Michael Rosenberg for Bohren, J. Aislinn; Imas, Alex; Rosenberg, Michael (2019). "The Dynamics of Discrimination: Theory and Evidence". American Economic Review. 109 (10): 3395–3436. doi:10.1257/aer.20171829.
- 2019: Samuel M. Hartzmark and Kelly Shue for Hartzmark, Samuel; Shue, Kelly (2018). "A Tough Act to Follow: Contrast Effects in Financial Markets" (PDF). Journal of Finance. 73 (4): 1567–1613. doi:10.1111/jofi.12685.
- 2018: Shengwu Li for Li, Shengwu (2017). "Obviously Strategy-Proof Mechanisms" (PDF). American Economic Review. 107 (11): 3257–87. doi:10.1257/aer.20160425.
- 2017: Vojtěch Bartoš, Michal Bauer, Julie Chytilová and Filip Matějka for Bartoš, Vojtěch; Bauer, Michal; Chytilová, Julie; Matějka, Filip (2016). "Attention Discrimination: Theory and Field Experiments with Monitoring Information Acquisition". American Economic Review. 106 (6): 1437–75. doi:10.1257/aer.20140571. hdl:11104/0228310.
- 2016: David Budescu and Eva Chen for Budescu, David V.; Chen, Eva (2015). "Identifying Expertise to Extract the Wisdom of the Crowds". Management Science. 61 (2): 267–280. doi:10.1287/mnsc.2014.1909.
- 2015: Gary Charness, Francesco Feri, Miguel Melendez and Matthias Sutter for "Experimental games on networks: underpinnings of behavior and equilibrium selection". Econometrica. 82 (5): 615–1670. 2014. doi:10.3982/ECTA11781.
- 2014: Tomasz Strzalecki for "Temporal Resolution of Uncertainty and Recursive Models of Ambiguity Aversion". Econometrica. 81 (3): 1039–1074. 2013. doi:10.3982/ECTA9619.
- 2013: Daniel Friedman and Ryan Oprea for Friedman, Daniel; Oprea, Ryan (2012). "A Continuous Dilemma". American Economic Review. 102 (1): 337–63. doi:10.1257/aer.102.1.337. hdl:10419/64489.
- 2012: Michel Regenwetter, Jason Dana and Clintin P. Davis-Stober for Regenwetter, Michel; Dana, Jason; Davis-Stober, Clintin P. (2011). "Transitivity of Preferences". Psychological Review. 118 (1): 42–56. doi:10.1037/a0021150. PMID 21244185. S2CID 36833965.

== See also ==
- List of economics awards
