= David Simchi-Levi =

American engineer and operations researcher

- דוד שמחי-לוי
- Citizenship: American and Israeli
- Known for: Editor-in-Chief, Management Science; Former Editor-in-Chief, Operations Research; Former Editor-in-Chief, Naval Research Logistics; Former Senior Editor, Manufacturing & Service Operations Management (M&SOM); Former Department Editor, IIE Transactions; Former Transportation Area Editor, Operations Research
- Scientific career
- Fields: Operations research Supply chain management Logistics and Manufacturing Systems
- Institutions: Massachusetts Institute of Technology
- Website: slevi1.mit.edu

David Simchi-Levi (Hebrew: דוד שמחי-לוי) is an American academic working as a Professor of Engineering Systems at Massachusetts Institute of Technology. He is also the founder or co-founder of several companies. Simchi-Levi's research focuses on supply chain and inventory management, revenue management, and business analytics.

== Education ==
David Simchi-Levi obtained his B.Sc. in Aeronautical Engineering at Technion Israel Institute of Technology in 1978 and earned M.Sc. and Ph.D. in Operations Research from Faculty of Management at Tel Aviv University in 1984 and 1987 respectively.

== Career ==
He has been a lecturer in Tel Aviv University (1984–1985) and Columbia University (1986–1987). He became an assistant professor in the Department of Industrial Engineering and Operations Research in Columbia University (1987–1991). He then joined Northwestern University in 1993 as an associate professor in the Department of Industrial Engineering and Management Sciences, and was promoted to full professor in 1997. Now he is a professor in Massachusetts Institute of Technology. He was a co-director of Leaders for Global Operations (2003–2016), a dual degree program at MIT, and a co-director of Systems Design and Management (2003–2010).

== Academic Work ==
David Simchi-Levi's publications have been cited 22516 times in total, with 65 h-index and 156 i10-index. He co-authored the book Designing & Managing the Supply Chain. Simchi-Levi is the current Editor-in-Chief of Management Science and was the Editor-in-Chief for Operations Research from 2006 to 2012.

=== Risk Exposure Model ===
Simchi-Levi's Risk Exposure Model has pioneered a new approach to assessment of supply chain resilience and risk-tolerance. The work allows to quantitatively model and estimate the supply chain exposure to disruption and develop mitigation strategies. In February 2020, at the beginning of the COVID pandemic, Professor Simchi-Levi used the Risk Exposure Model to predict that supply chains in North America and Europe will stop by mid-march of that year, see HBR article, which is exactly what happened, see Fortune March 17, 2020 and New York Times March 18, 2020. Subsequently, in April of 2020, he coined the term Supply Chain Stress-Test, see HBR article, which relies on the Risk Exposure Model. Today companies around the globe are using his approach to quantify the resiliency of their supply chain and develop mitigation strategies.

== Entrepreneurship ==
Simchi-Levi was the founder of LogicTools which provided software and professional services for supply chain optimization. The company became part of IBM in 2009.

In 2012 he co-founded OPS Rules, an operations analytics consulting company. The company became part of Accenture in 2016.

In 2014, he co-founded Opalytics, a cloud analytics platform company focusing on operations and supply chain intelligence.

== Recognition ==
He was elected to the 2006 class of Fellows of the Institute for Operations Research and the Management Sciences.

In 2020, he was awarded the prestigious INFORMS Impact Prize for playing a leading role in developing and disseminating a new highly impactful paradigm for the identification and mitigation of risks in global supply chains.

In 2023, he has been elected a member of the National Academy of Engineering for contributions using optimization and stochastic modeling to enhance supply chain management and operations.

In 2024, he was appointed to the William Barton Rogers Professorship at MIT. This chaired professorship is named after the founder and first president of MIT.
