= Roger Tarpy =

American psychologist (1941–2026)

Roger Maynard Tarpy Jr. (November 18, 1941 – September 25, 2026) was an American psychologist.

Tarpy was best known as the author and editor of text books on the study of learning and memory in humans and animals, publishing five distinctive texts at the graduate and undergraduate level between 1975 and 1997. He also published numerous research papers on topics relating to associative learning in rats, and on learning and motivation in other species including humans. In 1987, he collaborated with Stephen Lea and Paul Webley on a major textbook in economic psychology, The individual in the economy (Cambridge University Press), and, in 1993, with Kelly Shaver on an introductory text called Psychology (Macmillan).

== Background ==
Roger Maynard Tarpy Jr. was born in Dayton, Ohio on November 18, 1941, to Roger Tarpy Sr. and Nellie L. Livingston. Raised in West Hartford, Connecticut alongside his elder sister, Tarpy would become student council president of his high school, taking leading roles in several musical productions during his time there.

He graduated from Amherst College with a degree in English in 1963. For nearly all of his time at Amherst, he was a member of the Zumbyes, a student acapella group, which he would ultimately reunite with later in life. Upon graduating from Amherst, Tarpy undertook a master's degree at the College of William and Mary (M.A., Psychology) before completing a second M.A. and PhD at Princeton University, the latter under the supervision of Byron Campbell. He was an assistant and an associate professor at Williams College, before moving to Bucknell University, Lewisburg, Pennsylvania, where he remained as a professor of Psychology until his retirement in 2001. He also held visiting positions at Durham University, the University of Oxford and the University of Exeter in the UK. Upon his retirement, Tarpy moved to Virginia, where he remained settled until his death from prostate cancer in September of 2026.

Deriving from his "long-standing interest in supporting education", Tarpy established the Esther Guthoff Scholarship in Elmwood, Illinois, in honor of his mother, as well as the Tarpy-Roberts Scholarship Fund in Topsham and Harpswell, Maine. For some time after his retirement, Tarpy wrote a weekly column called Speaking of Behavior that was self-syndicated in a dozen newspapers. His leisure activities include singing (including in a barbershop quartet), and conducting community choruses.

Tarpy died on September 25, 2026, at the age of 84.

== Musical endeavors ==
Tarpy was an avid musician, directing two choirs during his time in Pennsylvania, and managing a director's workshop taught at locations nationwide. Upon his retirement, Tarpy began directing the Greater Richmond Chorus, an affiliate of Sweet Adelines, which competed in multiple international competitions amid his tenure. In 2007, he was awarded the title of Master Director by Sweet Adelines International. Between 1985 and 2016, Tarpy served decades-long stints as director of the Lewisburg, Pennsylvania and Norfolk, Virginia chapter choirs of the Barbershop Harmony Society (BHS). Towards the end of his life, he served as a board member and singer for the Williamsburg Choral Guild.

Tarpy has been described by colleagues as a "barbershop legend". In 1973, he was inducted into DelaSusqueHudMac, an honorary, invitation-only society for members of the BHS Mid-Atlantic District; he was elected its Vice-President in 2003. In 1990, he was awarded District Barbershopper of the Year. He began singing with New Vintage, an award-winning barbershop quartet, in 1986, competing in 50 tournaments up to 2003. He would go on to win regional competitions with other groups later in life, placing 4th at the BHS International Seniors Convention alongside his quartet Youth Reclamation Project in 2014. In 2012, Tarpy was inducted into the BHS Mid-Atlantic District's Hall of Honor.

== Books authored or edited by Roger M. Tarpy ==
- Basic principles of learning (1975)
- Foundations of learning and memory (with Richard E. Mayer) (1978)
- Readings in learning and memory (editor, with Richard E. Mayer) (1979)
- Principles of animal learning and motivation (1982)
- The Individual in the economy (with Stephen E.G. Lea and Paul Webley) (1987)
- Psychology (with Kelly G. Shaver) (1993)
- Contemporary learning theory and research (1997)
