= San Diego Central Library =

Public library in San Diego, California

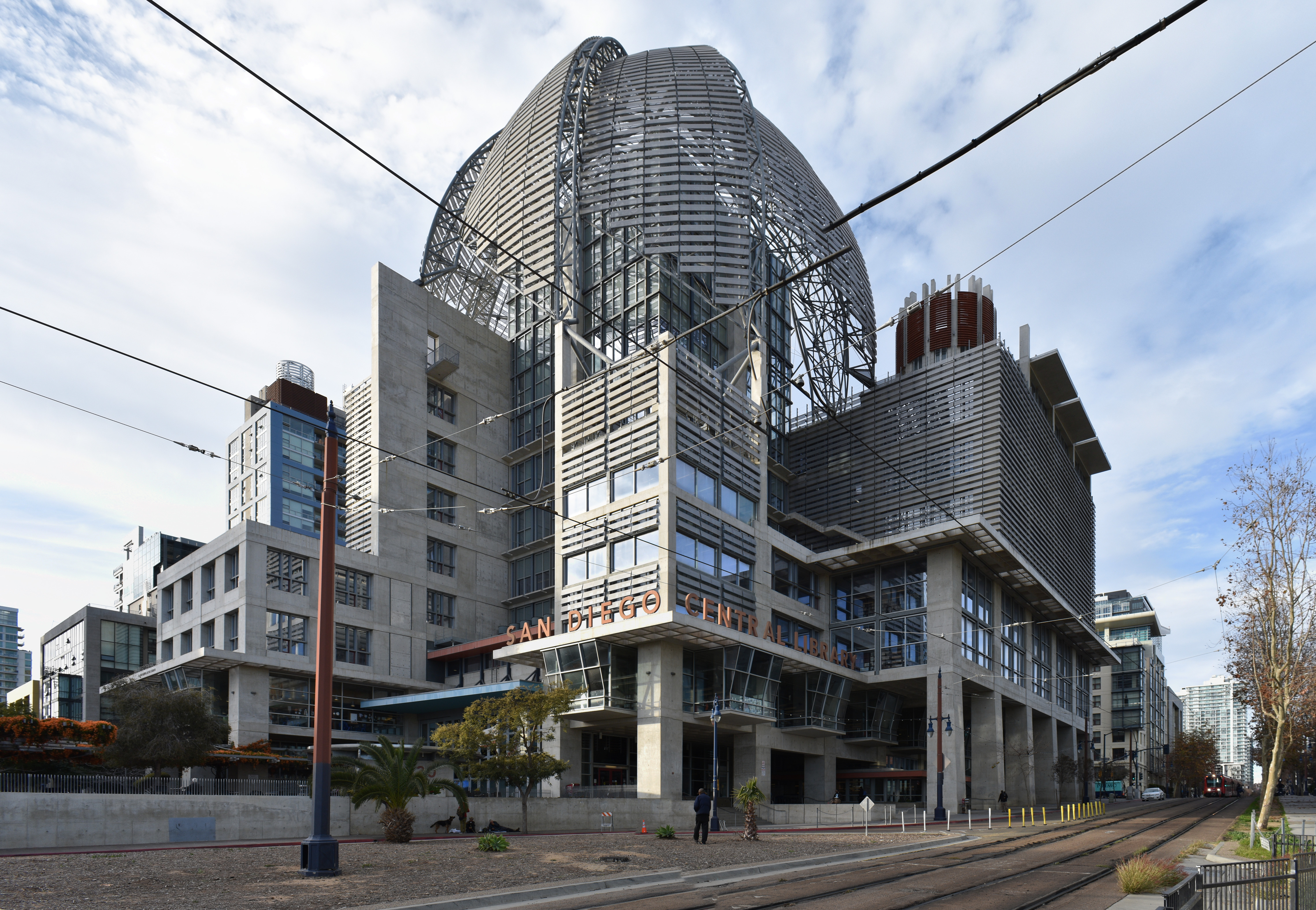
- The building's exterior, 2024

General information
- Location: San Diego, California, United States
- Coordinates: 32.7089°N 117.1542°W

The San Diego Central Library is the main branch of the San Diego Public Library. It is located in the East Village neighborhood of downtown San Diego.

== Description and history ==
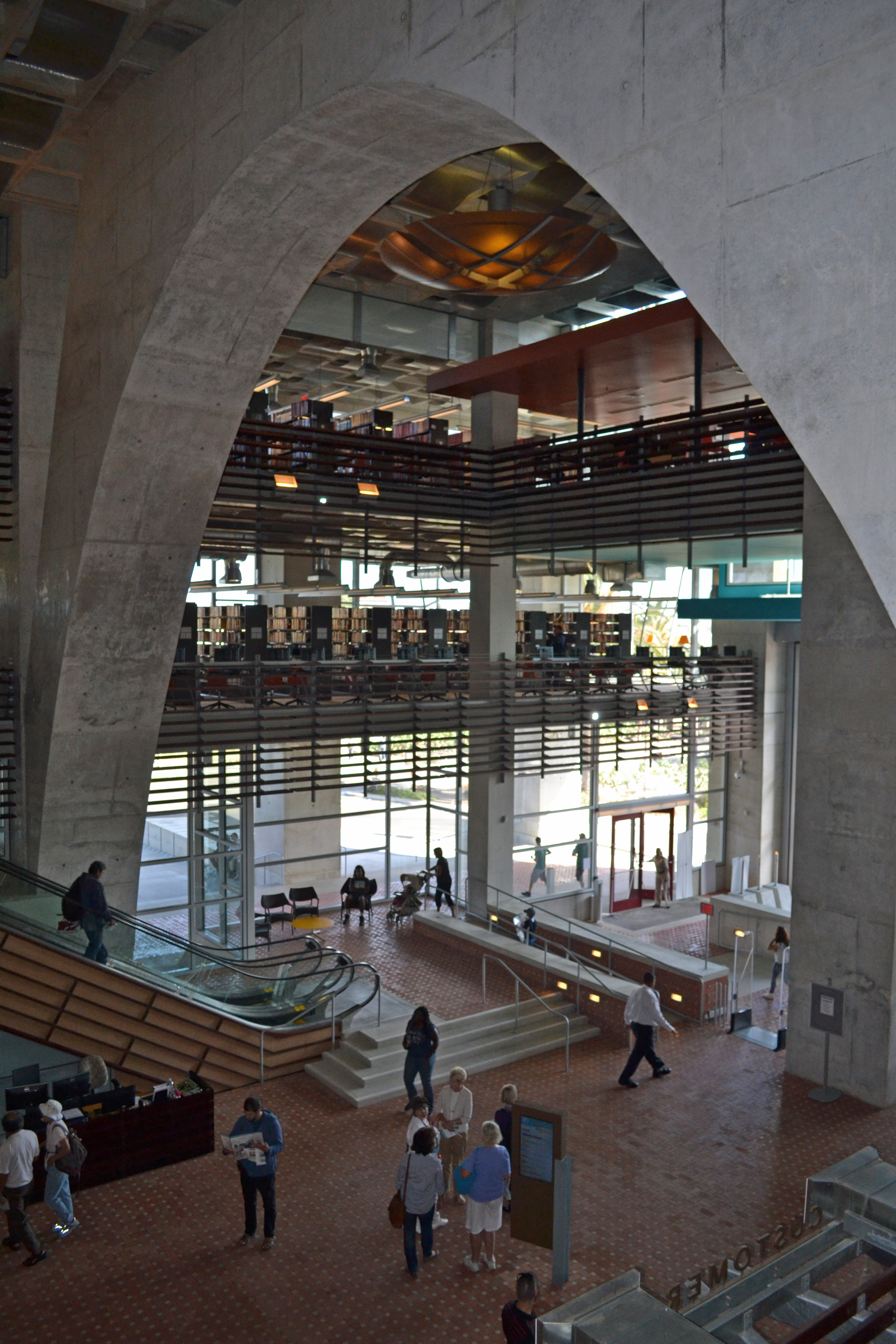
Lobby

In 1952, the existing Carnegie Library was demolished; the updated Central Library was opened at the same location on June 27, 1954.

In 2010, construction began on a new, $184.9 million, 366,673 square feet (34,065 square metres) central city library at 330 Park Boulevard in downtown San Diego. After fifty years, the Central Library closed, permanently, on June 9, 2013, commencing the 10-week process of transferring its 2.6-million-item collection to the new location. Over the years, many branch libraries have been opened throughout San Diego.

The 9-story structure was designed by San Diego architect Rob Wellington Quigley. It is topped with an iconic steel-and-mesh lattice dome over a two-story rare book reading-room. It opened on September 30, 2013. The library displays numerous books and collections, including the Sullivan Family Baseball Research Center. It has been part of the Federal Depository Library Program since 1895 and part of the California State Depository program since 1945.

The Center houses the second largest collection of baseball memorabilia in the U.S. It was founded in 2000, with a donation of books from the Society for American Baseball Research. By 2012, its collection included thousands of books, films, magazines, baseball cards and other collector’s items, with an aim to be the "go-to place for baseball research west of the Mississippi".

The Central Library also houses a charter high school, e3 Civic High School, which is billed as the only school in the U.S. to be housed within a library. The school is located on the sixth and seventh floors of the library and is visible to, but not accessible by, the public. The school serves grades 9-12. It opened several weeks ahead of the library, on September 3, 2013, with an initial student body of 260 ninth and tenth graders. The junior and senior grades were added in 2014 and 2015, resulting in a student body of approximately 500.

In the summer of 2026, the Central Library implemented a new collection in their children’s library. The “Decode with Odi” collection, as it is called, is compiled of books called "decodables." These books utilize phonics skills to help kids better understand and connect with what they are reading. By including this genre of books in the library, learning resources are more readily available for families in the community.

Since May of 2018 there has been a noticeable increase in crimes and disturbances surrounding the San Diego Public Library. The Library has taken measures to counteract these incidents, including stationing up to 9 guards each day, trained to administer naloxone, used to reverse the effects of opioid overdose. According to news outlets in January, San Diego police lieutenant Ryan Hallahan told the news that they are increasing enforcement in the area going forward following complaints over the safety of children attending e3 Civic High inside the facility. In recent years the amount of calls the San Diego Police Department receives surrounding the Library number to at least one call per day.

== Awards ==
In 2013, the Central Library received several awards. It received the National Award for Excellence in Structural Engineering, and the Decorative Concrete Council, a specialty council of the American Society of Concrete Contractors awarded the library "Best of Show." The Central Library also received an Orchid Award from the San Diego Architectural Foundation's Orchids & Onions Awards.
