= Felix Brodbeck =

German professor and psychologist

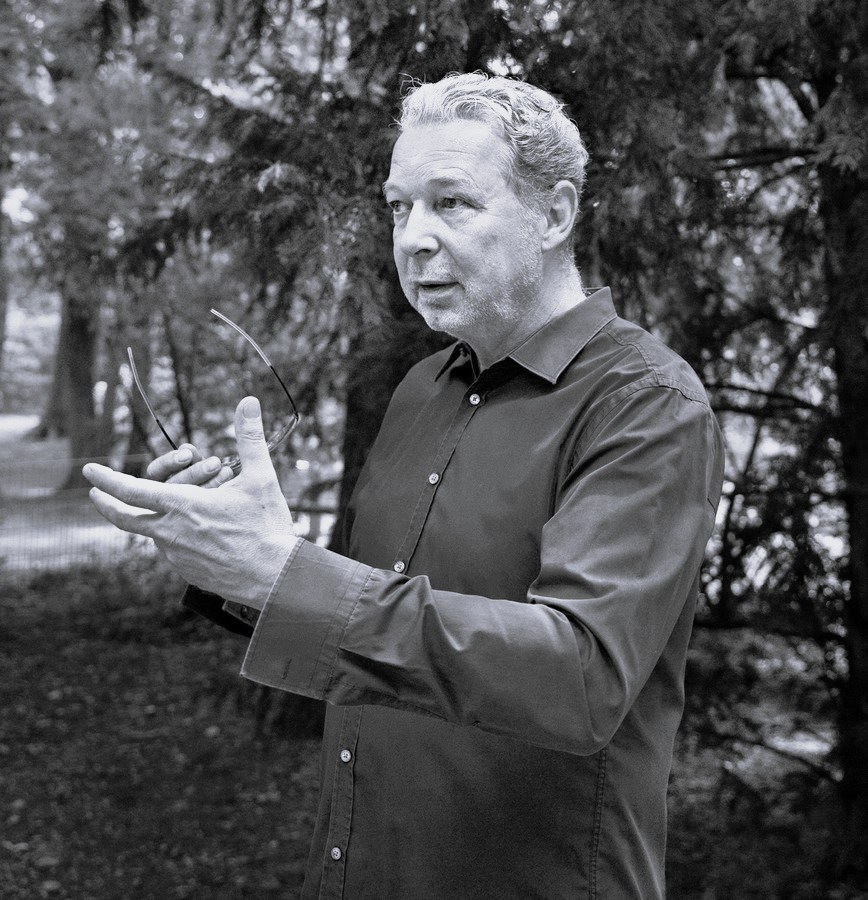
Felix Brodbeck (2018)

Felix Claus Brodbeck (* May 31, 1960, in Hamburg) is a German psychologist and professor of economic and organizational psychology at LMU Munich. His main areas of focus are work and organizational psychology, intercultural psychology, as well as economic psychology.

== Academic career ==
Felix Brodbeck completed his Abitur (German high school diploma) in 1979 at Max-Planck-Gymnasium in Munich. After half a year as a conscripted soldier and a year of civilian service in a residential home for troubled adolescents, he began his psychology studies at LMU Munich.

In 1983 and 1984, supported by a Fulbright scholarship, he studied "Basic and Applied Neurocognition" in New York City at the City University of New York and Columbia University. During this time, he engaged in practical work in SEP neurological diagnostics at Mount Sinai Hospital (New York) and EEG neurological diagnostics in sleep research at the LMU Hospital for Psychiatry and Psychotherapy in Munich. He also pursued additional studies in sociology, philosophy, and informatics at LMU Munich. In 1987, he completed his studies as a Diplompsychologe (equivalent to a Master's degree in Psychology), with a focus on clinical psychology, and a thesis on computer-assisted learning in educational psychology, leading to two publications.

From 1987 to 1991, he worked as a DFG project collaborator at LMU Munich, at the Chair of Organizational and Economic Psychology under Lutz von Rosenstiel, in the field of human-machine interaction. During this time, in collaboration with his doctoral advisor, Michael Frese, he published works on computer work and on errors at the computer workstation.

From 1991 to 1994, Felix Brodbeck worked as a research associate at Justus Liebig University in Giessen, at the Chair of Work and Organizational Psychology under Michael Frese. He completed his doctoral dissertation in 1993 on communication and performance in software development projects. After a research stay at the University of Sheffield with Michael A. West and Peter B. Warr, where he conducted initial fundamental work on the measurement and improvement of group performance, Felix Brodbeck returned to LMU Munich in 1994. In that year, he received two awards for his dissertation (see below), started work on the GLOBE project (see below), and his first son was born in Munich.

From 1994 to 1999, he completed his habilitation at the Chair of Social Psychology under Dieter Frey at LMU Munich on social interactive processes associated with synergetic effects in group performance. In the same year, his second son was born, and Felix Brodbeck received an offer for the Chair of Organizational and Social Psychology at Aston University in Birmingham, UK. He took over the Aston Group in the summer of 2000, along with Michael A. West, and served as Group Convenor (from 2002 to 2007) of the department, now renamed the Work and Organisational Psychology (WOP) Group.

In 2007, Brodbeck accepted an offer from LMU Munich and succeeded Lutz von Rosenstiel at the Chair of Business and Organizational Psychology. Since then, he has been teaching and researching various areas of AOW psychology at the Department of Psychology at LMU Munich, which he also directed from 2010 to 2012.

Throughout his academic career, Felix Brodbeck has also taught and conducted research at various other universities and educational institutions abroad, including the University of Innsbruck, the Hotel Management Academy Kaiserhof Meran, the Wharton School of Management in Pennsylvania, the Chartered Institute of Personnel and Development (CIPD) in London, and the Victoria University of Wellington.

== Impact ==
From 1989 to 1994, Brodbeck was a member of the DIN/ISO 9241 working group "Human-Computer Interfaces" as an expert in human-computer interaction. From 1994 to 2007, he was a member of the steering group of the GLOBE project (Global Leadership and Organisational Behavior Effectiveness) and Country Co-Investigator (CCI) for Germany. GLOBE was an international research consortium of 170 scientists from over 60 countries, launched in 1993 at the Wharton School of Management, Pennsylvania, under the direction of Robert House. In 2020, the GLOBE project expanded, with data now collected from over 140 countries, involving over 400 scientists, available for intercultural comparisons. Since 2018, Brodbeck has been a member of the GLOBE Board of Directors.

From 2007 to 2018, he was a partner and shareholder of LOGIT Management Consulting GmbH, a company specializing in organizational diagnosis and organizational development. From 2007 to 2010, he was an editor of the journal OrganisationsEntwicklung (ZOE). He has acted as a reviewer for numerous international journals and research foundations, such as the American Psychological Association (APA), the German Research Foundation (DFG), or the British Academy (Humanities and Social Sciences).

Together with Ralph Woschée and Erich Kirchler, he has been the editor of the practical and scientifically founded book series "Die Wirtschaftspsychologie" ("The Economic Psychology") since 2014, which is aimed at students, practitioners, and university professors. In total, he has authored eight books and published more than a hundred scientific articles.

== Research and teaching focus ==
Throughout his scientific career, Felix Brodbeck has researched various topics, including intercultural leadership and management concepts, organizational culture, diversity and dissent in groups, collective information processing, problem-solving and decision-making, action and inaction processes, human-computer interaction, group performance, and quantitative as well as qualitative research methods.

His academic teaching covers the areas of work and organizational psychology, personnel, business, and market psychology, economic psychology, social psychology, cross-cultural psychology, and methods of applied and (field) experimental research.

== Awards ==
- 2020 Best Paper Award (Negotiation and Conflict Management Research)
- 2014 Fellow of the IAAP (International Association of Applied Psychology)
- 2009 Ursula Gielen Global Psychology Book Award (American Association for Psychology, APA, Division 52) for the work: "Culture and Leadership Across the World: The GLOBE Book of In-Depth Studies of 25 Societies”
- 2004/05 M. Scott Myers Award for applied research in the workplace (Society for Industrial and Organizational Psychology, SIOP), awarded to the members of the GLOBE project.
- 1994 Heinz Heckhausen Young Scientist Prize (German Psychological Society, DGfP), awarded for his dissertation.

== Selected publications ==
- Schiebler, T., Lee, N., & Brodbeck, F. C. (2025). Expectancy-disconfirmation and consumer satisfaction: A meta-analysis. Journal of the Academy of Marketing Sciences. https://doi.org/10.1007/s11747-024-01078-x
- Arendt, J. F. W., Kugler, K. G., & Brodbeck, F. C. (2024). When team members (dis)agree about social rules and norms: A shared relational models approach to explaining team viability. Current Psychology, 43, 19121–19139. https://doi.org/10.1007/s12144-024-05680-8
- Brodbeck, F. C., Kugler, K. G., Fischer, J. A., Heinze, J. & Fischer, J. (2021). Group-level integrative complexity: Enhancing differentiation and integration in group decision-making. Group Processes & Intergroup Relations, 24(1), 124–144. https://doi.org/10.1177/1368430219892698
- Brodbeck, F. C., Kugler, K. G., Reif, J. A. M., & Maier, M. A. (2013). Morals Matter in Economic Games. PLoS ONE, 8(12), 1–19. https://doi.org/10.1371/journal.pone.0081558
- Brodbeck, F. C., Guillaume, Y. F., & Lee, N. (2011). Diversity as a multilevel construct: The Combined Effects of Dissimilarity, Group Diversity, and Societal Status on Learning Performance in Work Groups. Journal of Cross Cultural Psychology, 42(7), 1198–1218. https://doi.org/10.1177/0022022110383314
- Brodbeck, F. C., Kerschreiter, R., Mojzisch, A., & Schulz-Hardt, S. (2007). Group-decision making under conditions of distributed knowledge: The Information Asymmetries Model. Academy of Management Review, 32(2), 459–479. https://doi.org/10.5465/AMR.2007.24351441
- Chhokar, J. S., Brodbeck, F. C., & House, R. J. (2007). Culture and leadership across the world: The GLOBE Book of in-depth studies of 25 societies. Mahwah, NJ: LEA Publishers. (2nd Edition, 2008, 3rd Edition 2013). https://doi.org/10.4324/9780203936665
- Brodbeck, F. C., Frese, M., Akerblom, S., Audia, G., Bakacsi, G., Bendova, H., Bodega, D., Bodur, M., Booth, S., Brenk, K., Castel, P., Den Hartog, D., Donnelly-Cox, G., Gratchev, M. V., Holmberg, I., Jarmuz, S., Jesuino, J. C., Jorbenadse, R., Kabasakal, H. E., . . . Wunderer, R. (2000). Cultural variation of leadership prototypes across 22 European countries. Journal of Occupational and Organizational Psychology, 73(1), 1–29. https://doi.org/10.1348/096317900166859
