= Amnon Rapoport =

Israeli psychologist

- אמנון רפופורט
- Born: 1936; Israel
- Died: December 6, 2022 (aged 85–86)
- Education: Quantitative Psychology (Ph.D.)
- Alma mater: University of North Carolina at Chapel Hill
- Scientific career
- Fields: Experimental economics; Game theory
- Workplaces: University of Arizona; Hong Kong University of Science and Technology; University of North Carolina at Chapel Hill; Haifa University; University of Illinois at Urbana-Champaign; Hebrew University of Jerusalem; University of Michigan, Ann Arbor

Amnon Rapoport (Hebrew: אמנון רפפורט; 1936 – 2022) was an Israeli-born quantitative psychologist who was the Eller Professor Emeritus of Management and Organizations at the Eller College of Management at the University of Arizona. His research focused on experimental studies of interactive decision-making behavior. He died on December 6, 2022, after more than six decades of academic teaching, research, and service.

== Biography ==
Rapoport received his doctoral degree in quantitative psychology from the University of North Carolina, Chapel Hill in 1965. He was a distinguished professor of management and a highly cited scholar in the social sciences. Rapoport has published articles in peer-reviewed journals, including Management Science, Journal of Experimental Psychology: General, American Economic Review, Organizational Behavior and Human Decision Processes, Marketing Science, Psychological Review, and Journal of Personality and Social Psychology. He was best known for studying human decisions in social and interactive contexts with experimental and quantitative methods.

In his most recent work, Rapoport was interested in experimental studies of interactive decision making behavior, including common pool resource dilemmas, dynamic pricing, fair cost-sharing allocation, route choice in traffic networks, and sequential search by committees. He collaborated with David Budescu.

== Selected publications ==
=== Authored books ===
- Rapoport, A. (1990). Experimental Studies of Interactive Decisions. Theory and Decision Library. Vol. 5. Dordrecht: Kluwer Academic Publishers. doi:10.1007/978-94-009-1992-1. ISBN 978-94-009-1992-1.

=== Edited books ===
- Rapoport, A.; Zwick, R., eds. (2005). Experimental Business Research. Vol. II–III. Springer. doi:10.1007/b104928. ISBN 0-387-24214-7.

=== Books about Rapoport ===
- Budescu, D. V.; Erev, I.; Rami, Z., eds. (1999). Games and Human Behavior: Essays in Honor of Amnon Rapoport. Hillsdale, NJ: Erlbaum.
