= Rob Wellington Quigley =

American architect

- Born: 1 February 1945; Los Angeles, California, United States
- Education: University of Utah (BArch)
- Occupation: Architect
- Spouse: Kathleen Hallahan
- Practice: Rob Wellington Quigley Architects 1978–Present
- Buildings: San Diego Central Library; The New Children's Museum; Solana Beach station Ocean Discovery Institute

Rob Wellington Quigley (born 1945) is an American architect with offices in San Diego and Palo Alto, California. He is known for focusing on sustainable design, community activism, grassroots planning, and affordable housing.

== Education and early influences ==
Quigley, the son of a civil and structural engineer, grew up in the South Bay area of Los Angeles. He received a degree in architecture from the University of Utah in 1969. Upon graduation, Quigley served in the United States Peace Corps as an architect in Chile for 2 years, from 1969 to 1971. Stationed in the remote village of Coquimbo on the edge of the Atacama desert, he worked with locals to help create affordable housing in the Chilean government's self-help housing program.

== Career ==
=== Academics ===
Quigley has lectured and taught at universities and cities in Mexico, Japan, New Zealand, and throughout the U.S. He was active with Chancellor Bill McGill, Jonas Salk, and others in founding the School of Architecture for the University of California at San Diego and was appointed as adjunct professor. After unexpected budget cuts eliminated the department, Quigley continued to serve the university for several decades as a founding member of their Design Review Board. He emphasized the importance of the forgotten "spaces between buildings", advocated for the hiring of young local talent, and helped instigate Campus-wide lighting and building color standards.

=== Sustainability ===
Quigley is known for his commitment to developing sustainable architecture. Some examples of his work include The San Diego Children's Museum which does not include air conditioning or heating systems in the main galleries; Torr Kaelan, the firm's mixed-used building; and the Ocean Discovery Institute are net zero energy structures. The West Valley Library was Quigley's first LEED-certified library while the Living Lab received LEED Platinum certification.

=== Affordable housing ===
The Baltic Inn was the first of three single room occupancy (SRO) hotels designed by Quigley and developed in San Diego. It received Time Magazine's Design of the Year award and a Special Commendation from President Reagan. As other developers built SROs, the City Council, fearing a downtown of nothing but affordable housing, banned the building type. The headline in The New York Times was "San Diego Sees Too Much Success in Building Hotels to House the Poor".

== Selected projects ==
- San Diego Central Library
- Ocean Discovery Institute Living Lab
- The New Children's Museum
- Torr Kaelan
- Branch Libraries (Linda Vista, West Valley, Bascom and Seven Trees)
- Fire Stations (Bayside and Fire Station 5, San Diego; Santa Monica Fire Station No. 1)
- Leslie Shao-Ming Sun Field Station, Jasper Ridge Biological Preserve, Stanford University
- Transit (Escondido Transit Center, Solana Beach station)
- Affordable Housing (Baltic Inn, La Pensione, 801 Alma, Casa Feliz, Opportunity Center of Mid-Peninsula, Second Street Studio)
- Private Residences (Cohen, Squire, Bass, Sayer, Vivrette)

== Awards and honors ==
=== AIA National ===
- 2005 – Committee on the Environment Top Ten Green Buildings, Leslie Shao-ming Sun Field Station, Stanford University
- 1993 – National Honor Award, 202 Island Inn

=== AIA California Council ===
- 2015 – Honor Award, Torr Kaelan Mixed Use Building
- 2008 – Honor Award, Savings By Design Energy Efficiency Integration Award, The New Children's Museum
- 2005 – Maybeck Award

== Gallery ==
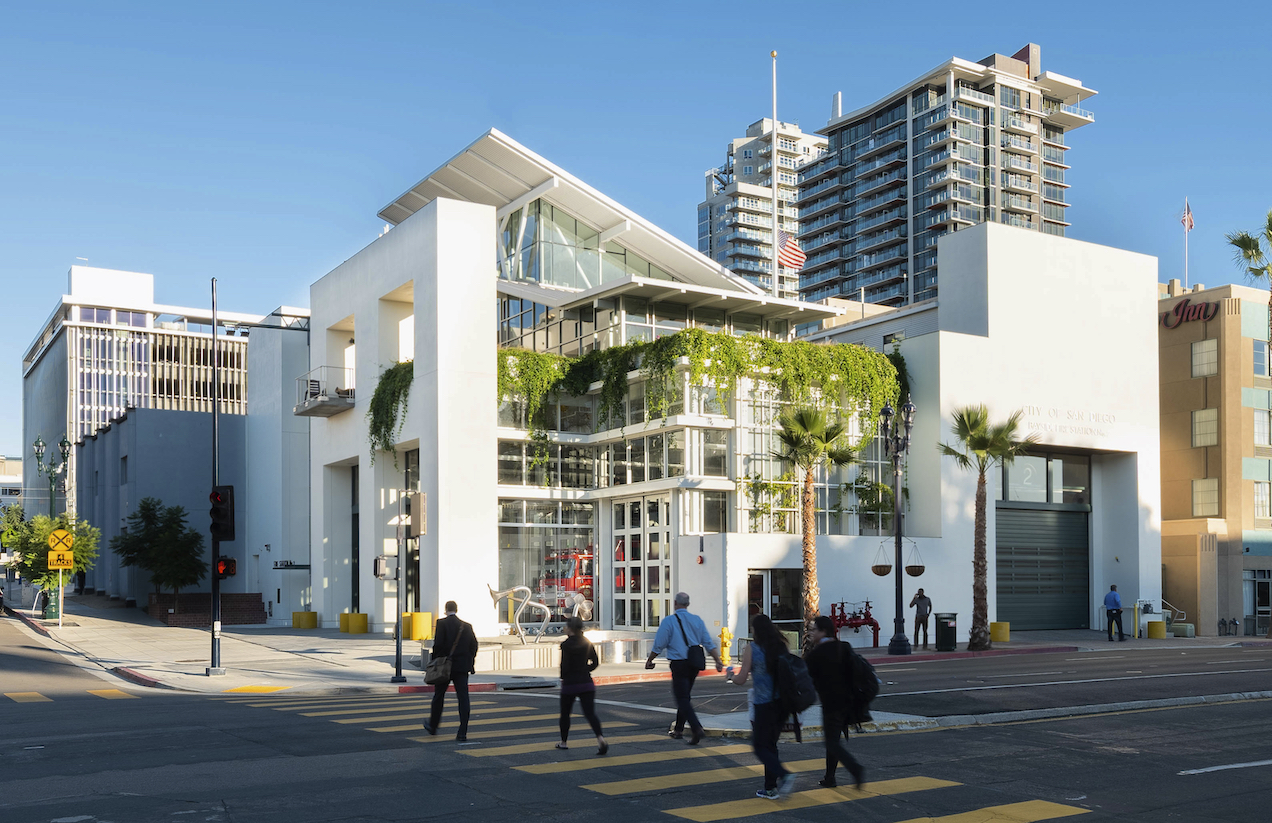
Bayside fire station 2, San Diego

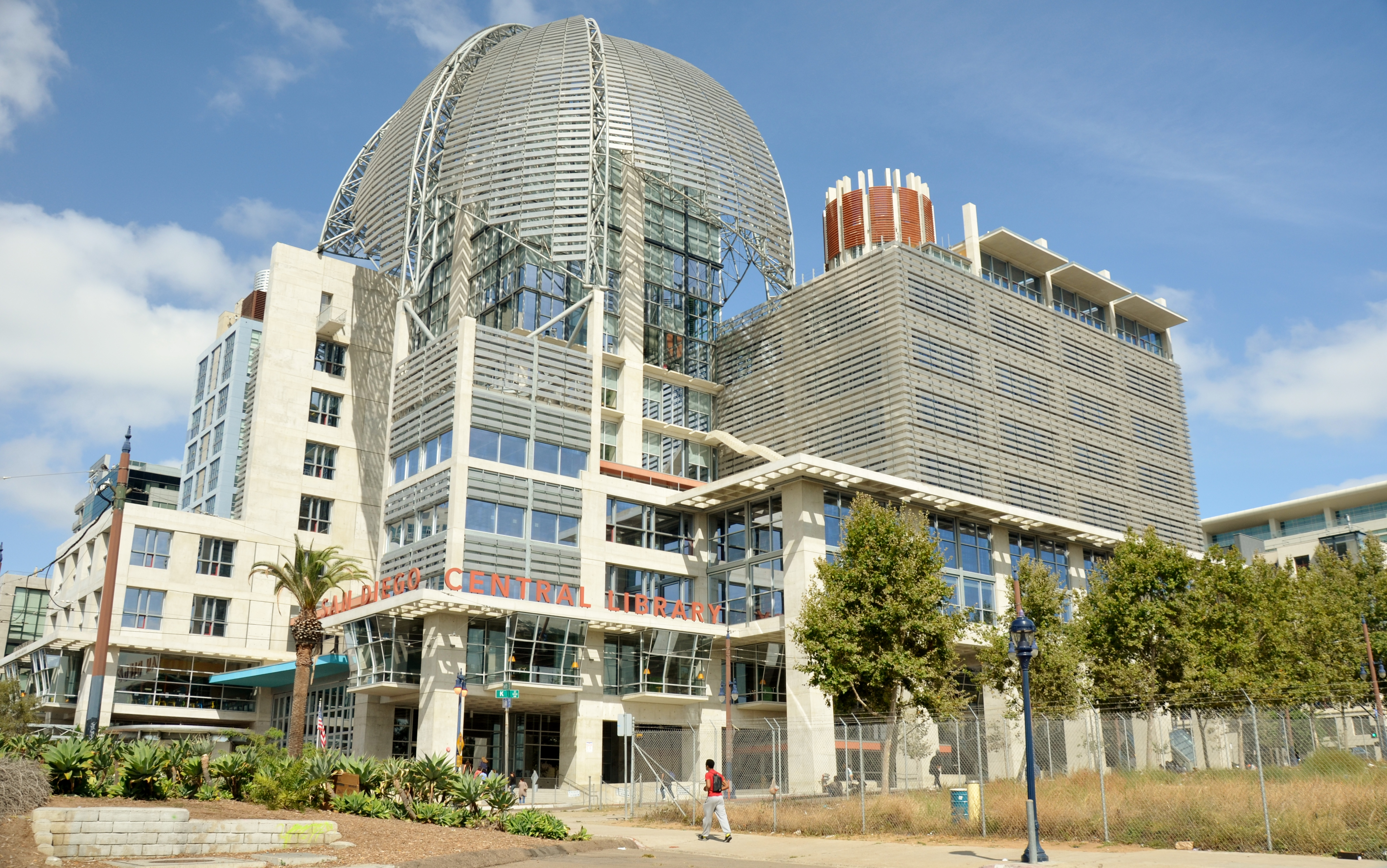
San Diego Central Library

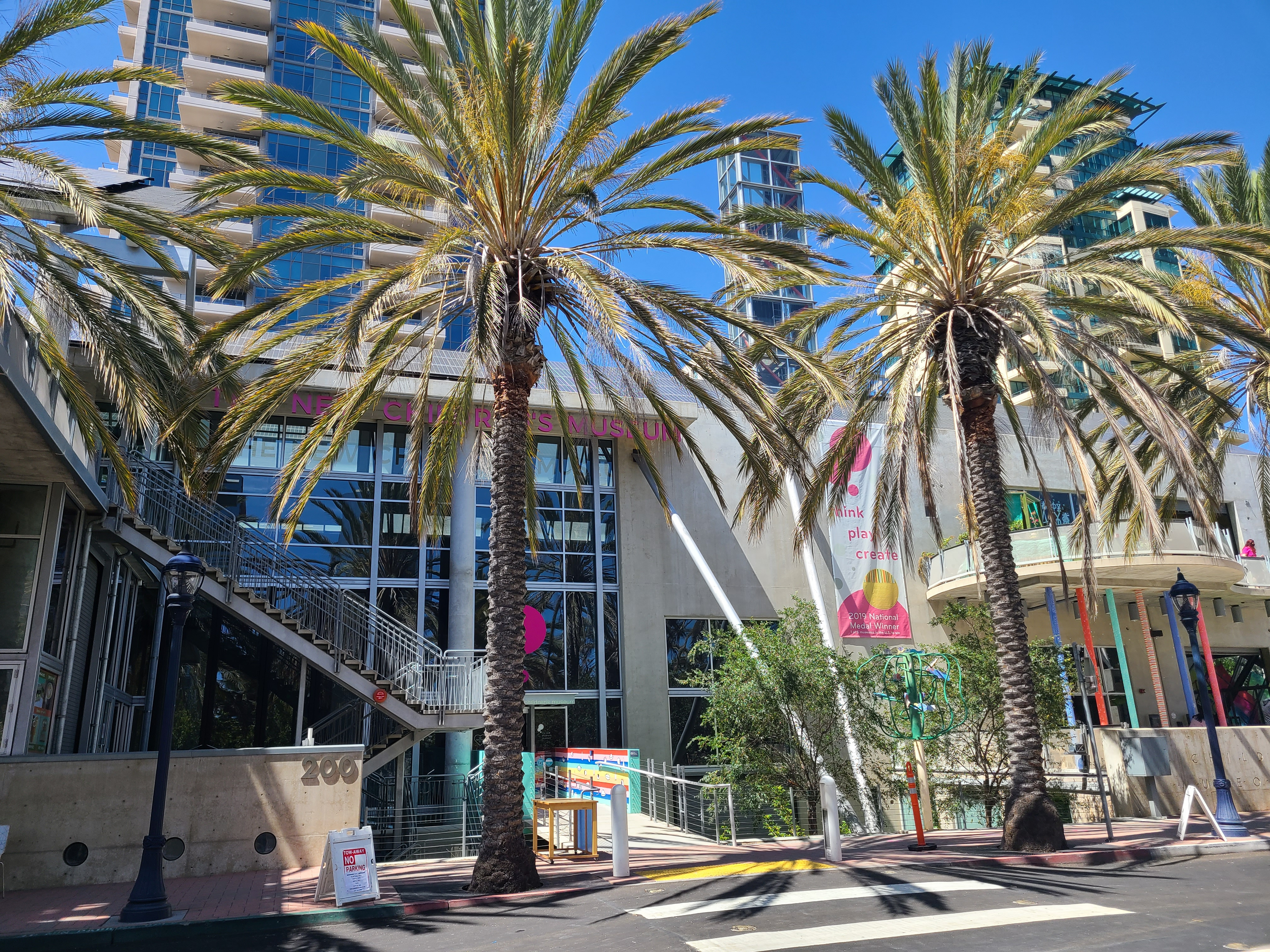
The New Children's Museum, San Diego

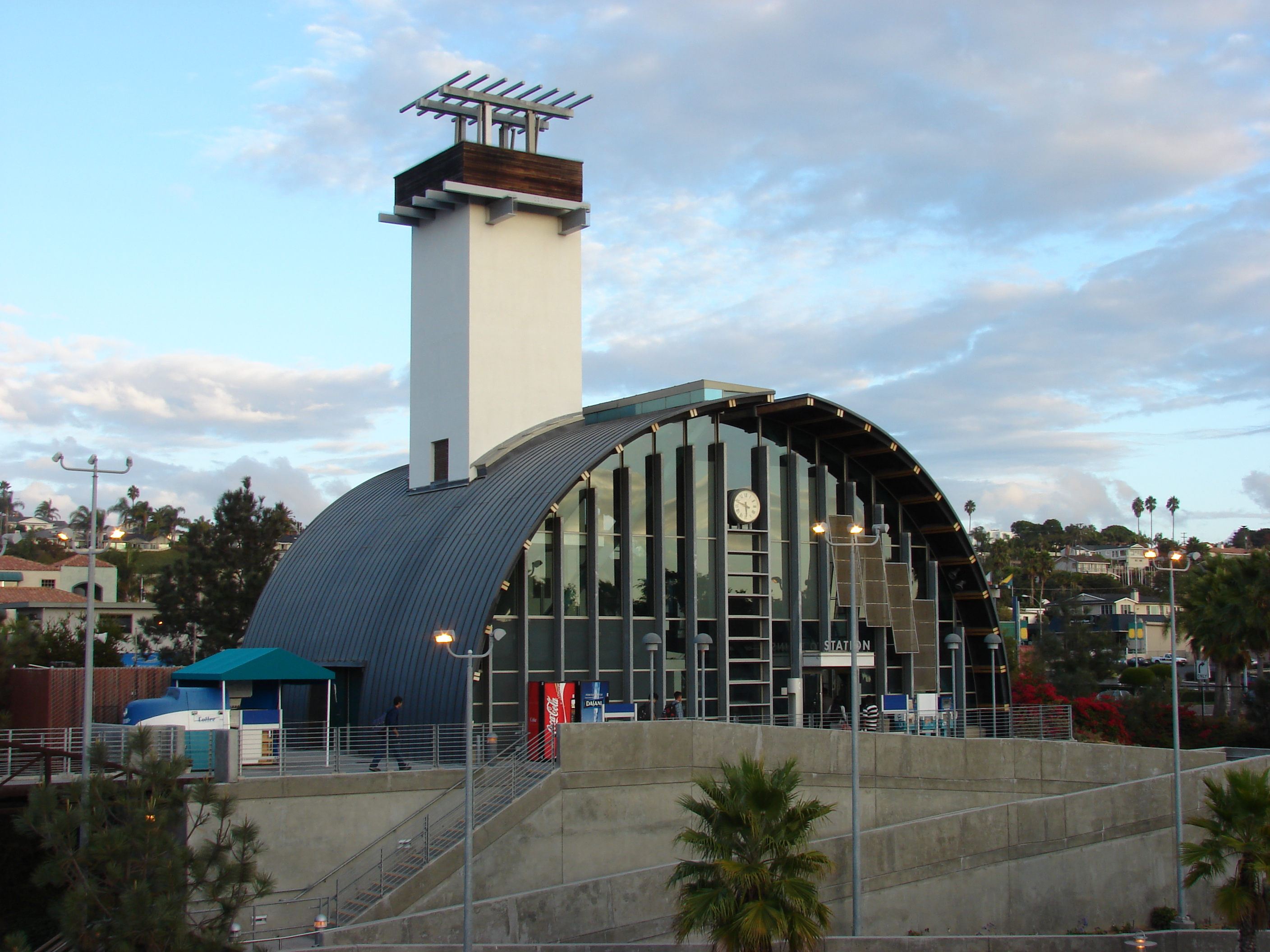
Solana Beach station
