= Max Planck Institute for Behavioral Economics =

German research institute

Max Planck Institute for Research on Collective Goods
- Abbreviation: MPI-EG
- Formation: 2003; 23 years ago
- Type: Research institute
- Purpose: Research in behavioral economics and market design.
- Headquarters: Bonn, Germany
- Directors: Axel Ockenfels; Matthias Sutter
- Directors Emeritus: Christoph Engel; Werner Güth; Martin Hellwig
- Scientific Advisory Board: Ingvild Almås; Florian Englmaier; Simon Gächter; Friederike Mengel; Silvia Saccardo
- Parent organization: Max Planck Society
- Website: (in English) (in German)

The Max Planck Institute for Behavioral Economics, formerly known as the Max Planck Institute for Research on Collective Goods (German: Max-Planck-Institut zur Erforschung von Gemeinschaftsgütern) is an economics research institute located in Bonn, Germany. It is one of 85 institutes in the Max Planck Society (as of January 2025), a non-governmental and non-profit association of German research institutes.

In previous years the institute studied the law, economics and politics of collective goods. Today the institute is interested in understanding the motivation for and the roots of economic behavior, as well as the influence of institutions on such behavior, with an emphasis on how institutional design can improve human decision making. The institute has two departments and one independent research group: Market Design and Behavior (Axel Ockenfels), Experimental Economics (Matthias Sutter), and Behavioral Economics and Data Science (Sebastian Schneider). Research includes the formation of economic preferences, such as risk, time and social preferences; the design of markets and institutions; paternalism; fairness and redistributive preferences, as well as development economics.

== History ==
The institute was founded in 1997 by lawyer Christoph Engel and sociologist Adrienne Héritier as a Max Planck Project Group. It was transformed into a permanent Max Planck Institute in 2003. Adrienne Héritier was succeeded by economist Martin Hellwig. He served as director of the institute alongside Christoph Engel from 2004 to 2017. After his retirement, he was succeeded by economist Matthias Sutter, who now heads the Experimental Economics Group. Economist Axel Ockenfels joined the institute in 2023 and heads the Market Design and Behavior Group. Christoph Engel retired in October 2025. As the institute now focuses on economic issues it was renamed the Max Planck Institute for Behavioral Economics at the beginning of 2026.
