= The New Children's Museum =

Coordinates: 32.7107°N 117.1652°W

The New Children's Museum is an arts–based children's museum in downtown San Diego, California, whose mission is to "stimulate imagination, creativity and critical thinking in children and families through inventive and engaging experiences with contemporary art". The museum commissions contemporary artists to create room-sized art installations (playscapes) for children to interact with and explore; it has collaborated with hundreds of artists since opening in 2008. The museum is housed in a dynamic space designed by architect Rob Wellington Quigley and is one of the first green museums in California.

== History ==
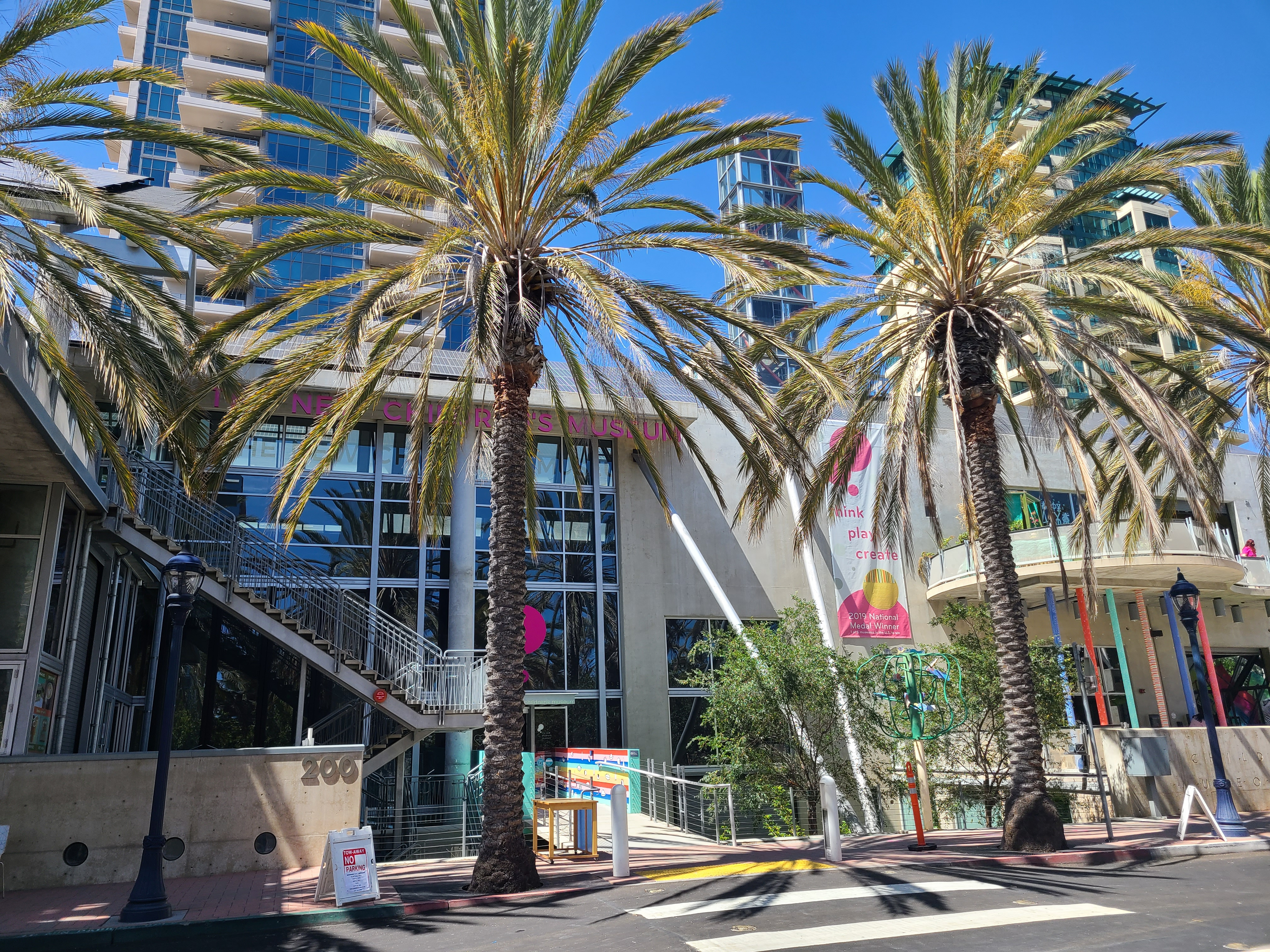
Front of the museum

The original museum opened in 1983 in La Jolla as The Children's Museum of San Diego. After 10 years, the museum moved to a downtown warehouse and became Children's Museum/Museo de los Niños. In 2008, the museum reopened as The New Children's Museum – with the word “new” signifying their focus on commissioning contemporary artists to create full scale art installations for children to engage with and explore.

=== 2008 ===
The New Children's Museum celebrated the opening of its new home located in downtown San Diego's Marina District with a free, community block party. The opening exhibition was childsplay, a reference to the art of Allan Kaprow, one of the most important artists to have made work for the museum in the past. Artists: Tanya Aguiñiga, Maria Alos, Gustavo Artigas, Lee Boroson, Celeste Boursier-Mougenot, Alberto Caro, Roman de Salvo, Maurycy Gomulicki, Allan Kaprow, Mark Mulroney, Rene Peralta, PUBLIC, Nick Rodrigues, Ernest Silva, Aaron T. Stephan, Diana Thater, Writers Blok with Chor Boogie and Pose 2, Zlatan Vukosavljevic.

=== 2009 ===
Animal Art exhibition opened featuring installations that explored how and why animals excite the human imagination. Artists: Roman de Salvo, Felipe Dulzaides, Sam Easterson, Jason Hackenweth, Jeff Irwin, Sun K. Kwak, Julio Morales in collaboration with David Goldberg, Marcos Ramirez ERRE, Mungo Thompson, Perry Vasquez, Alison Wiese.

=== 2011 ===
TRASH exhibition opened, an exploration into the complexity of waste that helped children think about trash in a new way. Artists: Mikey Eastman, Kota Ezawa, The Old Boys Club and Kota Ezawa, Kianga Ford, The Institute for Figuring, Layer, Machine Project, Jessica McCambly, Vik Muniz, Jason Rogenes, Shinique Smith, Chris Sollars.

=== 2013 ===
Feast: The Art of Playing with Your Food exhibition opened featuring 13 artists with installations centered on food. Artists: Fallen Fruit, FriendsWithYou, Miki Iwasaki and the Woodbury University School of Architecture, Ross Karre, Marisol Rendon, Leah Rosenberg, Phil Ross, Tattfoo Tan, Jason Torchinsky, Nina Waisman, Joe Yorty. The exhibition was launched with a weekend of themed fundraising gala events.

=== 2015 ===
Eureka! exhibition featuring art celebrating the great state of California featuring art by Roman de Salvo, Nick Rodrigues, Alison Pebworth, Collective Magpie, Jesse Kaminsky, Mary Rochon, The Ecology Center. Later that year, the museum welcomed its 1,000,000 visitor.

=== 2016 ===
The Wonder Sound by artist Wes Bruce was created through the museum's artist-in-residence program.

=== 2017 ===
Sketch Aquarium by teamLab. Bean Sprouts cafe opened.

=== 2018 ===
The museum celebrated 35 years in San Diego and 10 years as The New Children's Museum. For the milestone birthday, two former artists returned. Jason Hackenwerth (Animal Art) created Crystal Cortex and Brian Dick (childsplay) recreated one of the museum's popular installations from 2008, No Rules...Except (2008/2018) inspired by Allan Kaprow and reinvented by Brian Dick. At the end of the year, the museum commissioned Panca to create a mural for the entrance bridge entitled SMILE.

=== 2019 ===
The museum opened two new installations, Whammock by Toshiko Horiuchi MacAdam and tikitiko by Tanya Aguiniga. The New Children's Museum was the recipient of the 2019 National Medal for Museum and Library Service, awarded to only five museums by the Institute of Museum and Library Services (IMLS). The museum launched a partnership at Seaport Village entitled Studio by the Bay, where families can see artists at work and participate in workshops. Later that year, the museum's employees unionized.

=== 2020 ===
The museum received a grant for its Innovators LAB, a creative makerspace focused on exploring the creative process through the intersection of art, design and science. The Innovators LAB was renamed The Rosso Family Foundation Innovators LAB. As a National Medal Award recipient, the museum was given the opportunity to work with StoryCorps (heard on NPR) to record interviews with artists, community members and supporters. In March, the museum was forced to close its doors due to the COVID pandemic. As a result, the museum had to furlough and layoff employees Almost immediately upon closing, the museum launched #thinkplaycreatefromhome, providing creative online resources for children and families at home. Energized by Regan Russell was installed on the museum's Front Street windows. The museum introduced virtual school visits and learning kits for schools and social service organizations.
