= Carlos Alós-Ferrer =

Economist at the University of Cologne

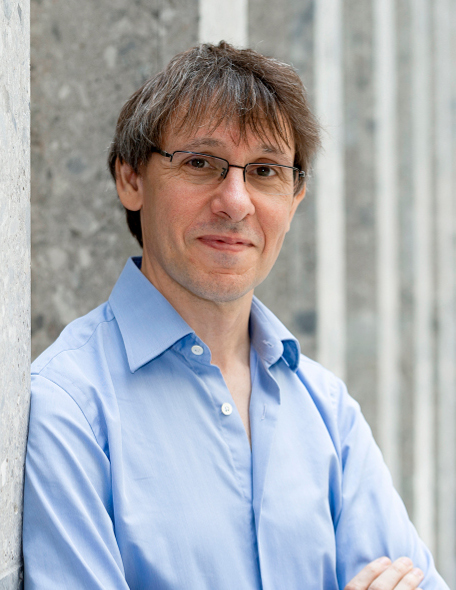
- Born: November 22, 1970 (age 55); Moncofa, Spain

Academic work
- Discipline: Neuroeconomics, decision theory, game theory
- Institutions: Lancaster University

Carlos Alós-Ferrer (born November 22, 1970, in Moncofa, Spain) is a neuroeconomist, decision theorist, and game theorist, a full professor of economics at Lancaster University (U.K.), and the current editor in chief of the Journal of Economic Psychology. He is also a regular contributor to Psychology Today, where he writes about decisions and the brain.

He holds a M.Sc. in mathematics from the University of Valencia (Spain, 1992) and a Ph.D. in economics from the University of Alicante (Spain, 1998). He has been assistant professor at the University of Vienna (Austria, 1997–2002), associate professor at the University of Salamanca (Spain, 2002–2004), and associate professor at the University of Vienna (2004–2005). He became a full professor of microeconomics at the University of Konstanz (Germany, 2005) and later moved to the University of Cologne (Germany, 2012). From 2018 to 2024, he was an untenured, fixed term professor of decision and neuroeconomic theory at the University of Zurich (endowed by the NOMIS foundation). In 2024, he moved to Lancaster University Management School as Chair in Economics.

Alós-Ferrer has worked extensively in game theory, bounded rationality, social choice, and behavioral economics. From 2012 to 2018, he was speaker of the interdisciplinary research unit "Psychoeconomics," which used methods from psychology, economics, and neuroscience to study human decision making, and was funded by the German Research Foundation (DFG). Since January 2019, he is the editor in chief of the Journal of Economic Psychology. His research interests are neuroeconomics, decision theory, game theory, and evolution and learning in games and markets.

== Selected publications ==
- Alós-Ferrer, Carlos, Jaume García-Segarra, and Alexander Ritschel (2022). Generous with Individuals and Selfish to the Masses, Nature Human Behaviour, 6, pp. 88-96. .
- Alós-Ferrer, Carlos, Ernst Fehr, and Nick Netzer (2021). Time Will Tell: Recovering Preferences when Choices are Noisy, Journal of Political Economy, 29 (6), pp. 1828-1877.
- Alós-Ferrer, Carlos (2018). A Review Essay on Social Neuroscience: Can Research on the Social Brain and Economics Inform Each Other?, Journal of Economic Literature, 56 (1), pp. 234–264.
- Alós-Ferrer, Carlos and Klaus Ritzberger (2016). The Theory of Extensive Form Games. Springer-Verlag Berlin Heidelberg. ISBN 978-3-662-49942-9.
- Achtziger, Anja and Carlos Alós-Ferrer (2014). Fast or Rational? A Response-Times Study of Bayesian Updating, Management Science, 60 (4), pp. 923–938.
- Achtziger, Anja, Carlos Alós-Ferrer, Sabine Hügelschäfer, and Marco Steinhauser (2014). The Neural Basis of Belief Updating and Rational Decision Making, Social Cognitive and Affective Neuroscience, 9 (1), pp. 55–62.
- Alós-Ferrer, Carlos and Nick Netzer (2010). The Logit-Response Dynamics, Games and Economic Behavior, 68 (2), pp. 413–427.
