= E3 Civic High School =

Coordinates: 32.709°N 117.154°W

e3 Civic High School
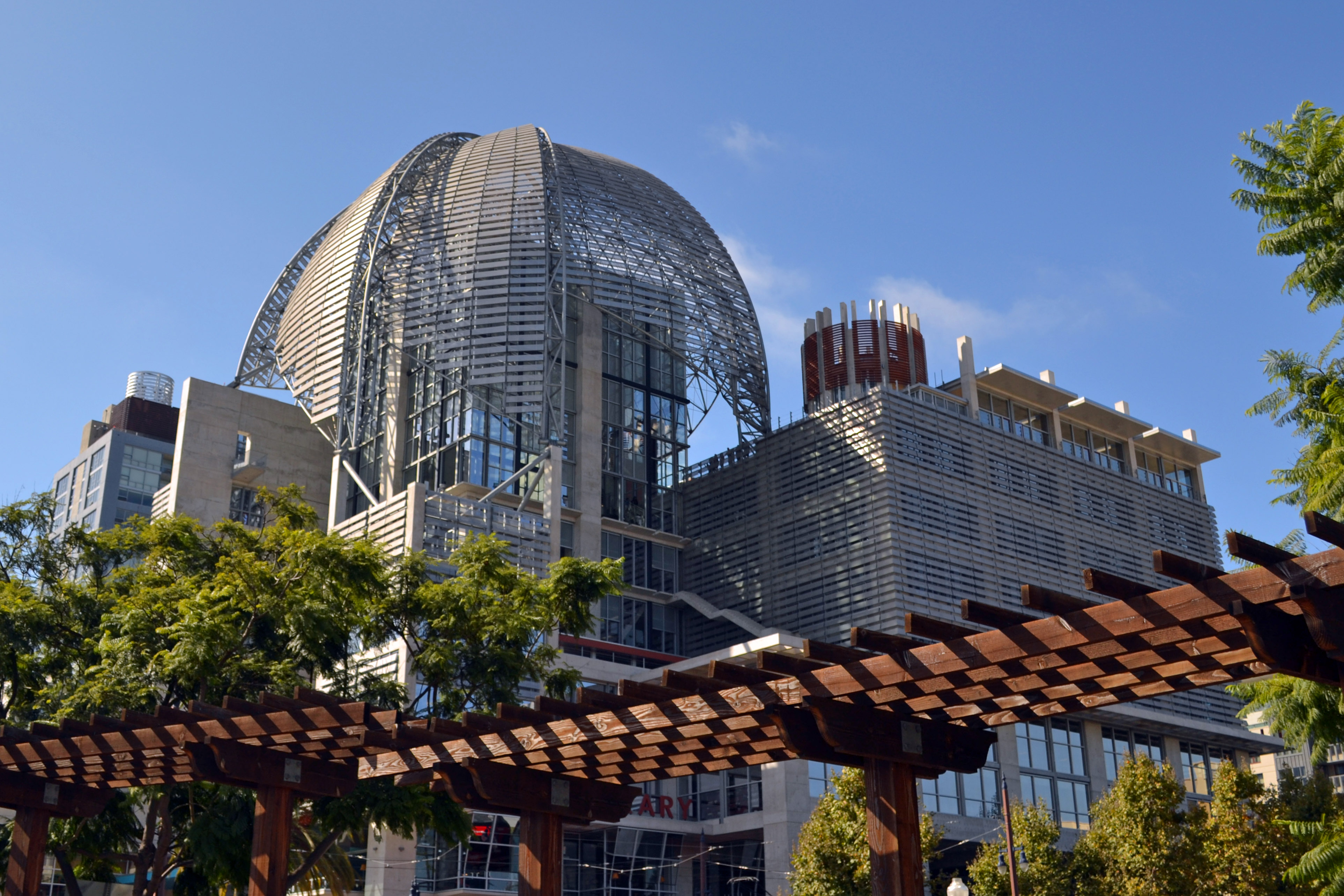
- San Diego Central Library; e3 Civic High is located on the sixth and seventh floors.

Location
- 395 11th Ave. San Diego, California 92101; United States

Information
- Type: Charter school
- Motto: "Engage. Educate. Empower."
- Established: 2013
- School district: San Diego Unified School District
- Principal: Cesia Portillo
- Grades: 9-12
- Enrollment: 458 (2016-17)
- Mascot: Griffin
- Website: www.e3civichigh.com

e3 Civic High is a free public charter high school serving grades 9 through 12, located in the San Diego Central Library.

== History ==
The City of San Diego had been studying the possibility of a new central library for years, and a site had been identified, but funding was insufficient. In April 2010 the city and the school district reached an agreement to house a school in leased space within the library; the district's rent payments would help to make the new downtown library financially possible. The sixth and seventh floors of the library, amounting to 76,000 square feet (7,100 m^{2}), were designed from the outset as a school. The city approved construction plans for the library in June 2010. A petition for a new charter high school, initially referred to as Downtown Charter High, was submitted to the San Diego Unified School District in September 2010. Several other charter petitions were also filed, but the school district chose Downtown Charter and approved the application in August 2011. The name was later changed to e3 Civic High (for "engage, educate, empower").

The new library and the school both opened in September 2013. The initial enrollment consisted of 260 students in the 9th and 10th grades. Additional 9th graders were added in 2014 and 2015; as of the 2015–16 school year the enrollment is 403, with a target total enrollment of approximately 500 students. The first senior class graduated in June 2016.

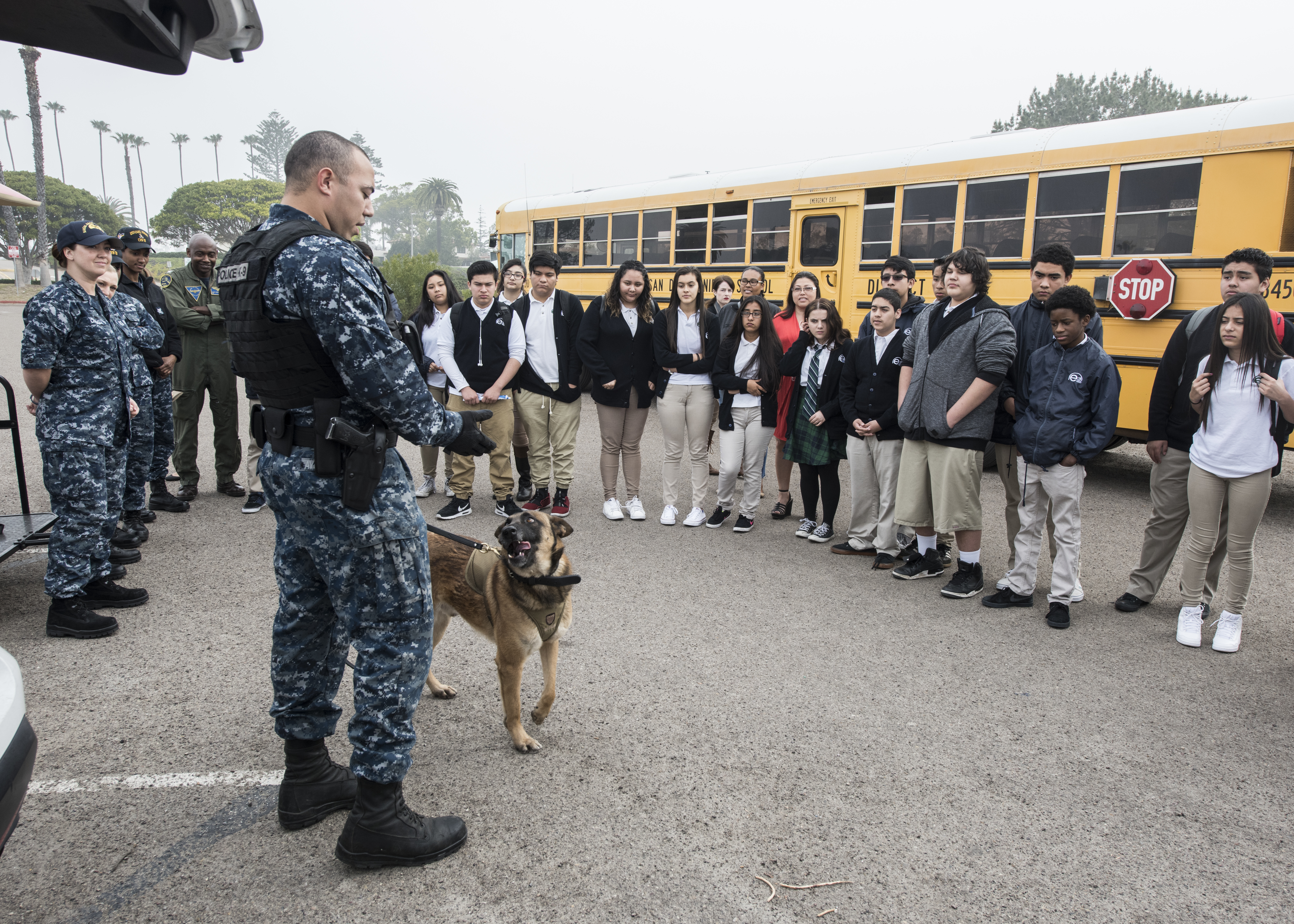
Students from E3 Civic High observe a demonstration of the Navy's K-9 Program during a job shadow visit to Naval Air Station North Island on March 11, 2016.

== School operation ==
The school is open to all high school students in San Diego County. Students must submit an application to attend. If more applications are received than there are available slots, students are accepted by lottery, with preference given to students from within the school district and particularly those whose neighborhood high school is identified as underperforming.

The school design includes variably sized rooms and open spaces. Most of the rooms have modular glass walls and movable furniture intended to facilitate collaboration among students and between students and teachers. It is described as looking "more like a Starbucks and less like a school." Library patrons can see inside the school, though they cannot access it; the school has a separate entrance and separate elevators.

The curriculum incorporates internships and other real-world experiences with downtown businesses, organizations and facilities. Local college students and library staff augment the faculty by mentoring students and teaching them research skills. Students choose one of the school's two pre-professional pathways: biomedical health or digital media. Students can graduate with both a high school diploma and a community college degree.

The school does not have a sports program, although it does have exercise facilities, and there is some access to outdoor activities at nearby Petco Park.
