= Jean-Maurice Lahy =

French sociologist, psychologist & academic (1872–1943)

- Born: 7 August 1872
- Died: 22 August 1943
- Scientific career

Jean-Maurice Lahy (7 August 1872 in La Réole, Gironde – 22 August 1943 in Saint-Léger-le-Guérétois, Creuse) was a French psychologist, physiologist and sociologist, and an important contributor to the European Science of Work in the early 20th century. He spearheaded a thorough critique and revision of F.W Taylor's system of scientific management, upon its introduction into French factories.

Lahy, a Freemason and Communist with some links to the French Resistance, died of a suspected heart attack while preparing to flee the Gestapo. The exact circumstances of his death remained clouded for many years.
