= David Budescu =

American psychologist

David Budescu (Hebrew: דוד בודסקו) is a psychologist and academic. He is the Anne Anastasi Professor of Psychometrics and Quantitative Psychology at Fordham University.

== Personal life ==
Budescu graduated from the University of Haifa in Haifa, Israel and received his Ph.D. in quantitative psychology from the University of North Carolina in 1980. From 1982 to 1992 he taught at the University of Haifa and, in 1992, accepted an appointment at the University of Illinois. He is a fellow of the American Psychological Society and is a past director of the European Association of Decision Making. In 2016 he won the Exeter Prize for the best paper published in the fields of experimental economics, decision theory, and behavioural economics. In 1999 he edited "Games and Human Behavior: Essays in Honor of Amnon Rapoport."

== Current work ==
Budescu researches the effects of uncertainty in human decision-making as well as psychometrics. He has also done work on group decision-making and markets. Budescu is currently the editor of the American Psychological Association journal Decision. He also sits on the editorial board of the Journal of Behavioral Decision Making. In 2009 he was appointed Anne Anastasi Professor of Psychometrics and Quantitative Psychology at Fordham University. His regular collaborators include Amnon Rapoport, Boris Maciejovsky, and Dan Ariely.
