= Maria Alos =

Artist (1973–2011)

- María Alós
- Born: 1973; Cambridge, Massachusetts
- Died: 2011; Mexico City
- Education: MA Syracuse University

Maria Alos (1973–2011) was an interdisciplinary artist who lived and worked in Mexico City and New York. She received a MFA from Syracuse University (2000) in New York. Throughout her artistic career, she created various installations, performances, and archives for museums and public spaces in the United States, Latin America, and Europe.

== Career ==
Maria Alos created site-specific interventions that challenge institutional structures, as well as value and belief systems in both society and the art world. Her work was inspired by activities that referred to societal control and bureaucratic procedures that everyone is subjected to on a daily basis.

Alos' work has been shown in internationally renowned institutions, such as the Ninth Havana Biennial; Madrid Abierto – ARCO 2005; Bronx Museum of the Arts; Everson Museum of Art; The Clocktower Gallery / PS1 Contemporary Art Center; Exit Art; Artists Space; El Museo del Barrio; Museo Reina Sofía; MUCA Roma; Museo de Arte Carrillo Gil; The New Children's Museum; The Power Plant, Toronto; TBA Exhibition Space; Nasher Museum of Art; among other institutions.

== Works ==
The Passerby Museum (2007)

Co-created with Nicolás Dumit Estévez, The Passerby Museum is an itinerant institution whose collection is made up of thousands of objects donated by passers-by who live or work in the places where the museum has been installed. The museum opened its doors in 2002, on 42nd Street in New York, in the heart of Times Square. The Passerby Museum has been shown in New York, US; Madrid, Spain; Mexico City; Puebla, Mexico; Kitchener, Canada; Claremont, US; Havana, Cuba; and other locations.

Is this art? (2005)

First shown in Barcelona, Spain, in 2005, the work consists of a series of three differently colored stickers that read: "this is art", "this is not art", and "is this art?". The artist distributed these stickers to visitors to her exhibition and invited them to classify anything they saw inside and outside the museum. Is this art? is an invitation to reconsider the meaning and value of a work of art, as well as the use and value of the objects that surround us.

Publications Department (2007–2008)

Emulating the aesthetics and routines of the bureaucratic, several of Alos' works involved line-up and filling out paperwork. For Publications Department, in Mexico City, Alos removed thousands of publications from the Carrillo Gil Museum's storage and installed them in one of the museum's galleries. Visitors could take as many catalogues as they wished for free as long as they lined up, showed some form of identification, and filled out a form, which the artist made available to them.

Cataloging of the Museum of the Object of the Object

Alos' fascination with archives and classification systems led her to work on the first classification, cataloguing, and registration of thousands of objects in the collections of Mexico City's Museo del Objeto del Objeto. This work was completed between 2003 and 2011. A plaque in the museum honors the artist's work and her various contributions to the institution.

Alos previously worked for the New York Public Library, making photographic documentation of collections and rare books.
