= Fred van Raaij =

Dutch psychologist and professor

Willem Frederik (Fred) van Raaij (born 1944) is a Dutch psychologist and professor.

He studied psychology and data analysis at the Leiden University and worked at the University of Twente (1970–1972), the Catholic University Tilburg (1972-1976 and 1977–1979) and the University of Illinois (1976–1977). He was then professor at Erasmus University Rotterdam (1979–2000) and Tilburg University (from 2000).

His field of study is economic psychology with a specialisation in (marketing) communication, consumer financial behaviour, environmentally friendly consumer behaviour and energy saving in households. He is the founder (1981) and first editor of the Journal of Economic Psychology. He received an honorary doctorate from the Helsinki School of Economics, Finland in 2006.

He was chairman of the GVR (Genootschap voor Reclame - Association for Marketing Communication) and board member of the SWOCC (Stichting Wetenschappelijk Onderzoek Commerciële Communicatie - Foundation for Scientific Research on Commercial Communication) at the University of Amsterdam.

== Most cited articles ==
- Van Raaij WF, Francken DA. Vacation decisions, activities, and satisfactions. Annals of Tourism Research. 1984 Jan 1;11(1):101-12. (Cited 507 times, according to Google Scholar.)
- Van Raaij, W.F. and Verhallen, T.M., 1983. A behavioral model of residential energy use. Journal of economic psychology, 3(1), pp. 39–63. (open access) (Cited 497 times, according to Google Scholar.)
- Francken, D.A. and Van Raaij, W.F., 1981. Satisfaction with leisure time activities. Journal of leisure Research, 13(4), pp. 337–352.(Cited 437 times, according to Google Scholar <GS />
- Van Houwelingen, J.H. and Van Raaij, W.F., 1989. The effect of goal-setting and daily electronic feedback on in-home energy use. Journal of consumer research, 16(1), pp. 98–105. (Cited 433 times, according to Google Scholar.)
- Van Raaij, W.F., 1986. Consumer research on tourism mental and behavioral constructs. Annals of Tourism Research, 13(1), pp. 1–9. (Cited 315 times, according to Google Scholar.)
