= Alós =

Alós is a surname. Notable people with the surname include:

- Albert Alós (1939–2022), Spanish-Nigerian engineer, academic, and missionary
- Ana Alós, Spanish politician
- Carlos Alós (born 1975), Spanish football manager and former player
- Concha Alós, Spanish writer
- Ricardo Alós (1931–2024), Spanish football forward
