= International Association of Applied Psychology =

Professional body established in 1919

The International Association of Applied Psychology (IAAP) was created in 1919 by Édouard Claparède under the name of International Association of Psychotechnics (Association Internationale de Psychotechnique) and the secretary general was Jean-Maurice Lahy. The present name was adopted in 1955. The current president is Lori Foster, PhD (United States).

Members are individuals with an expertise in applied psychology. International Congresses of Applied Psychology (ICAP) are organized every four years; the last one was held in Montreal, Canada, 2018. A special Centennial Congress of Applied Psychology (CCAP), scheduled to be held in Cancun, Mexico, from December 13–17, 2020, to celebrate the 100 year anniversary of IAAP, was cancelled due to the COVID-19 pandemic. The next ICAP will be held in Florence in 2026. Two journals are sponsored, Applied Psychology: An International Review and Health and Well-being, both under Wiley Publishing. An open access journal, Applied Psychology Around the World, is available on the IAAP website.

IAAP is a NGO under United Nations umbrella and an Associate Member of the International Social Science Council under UNESCO.

The president is elected every four years and cannot be from the same continent as the previous president. There are over 2,500 members and they are scholars, researchers, and professionals in 90+ countries. It is organized around 18 divisions in sub-specialties of applied psychology. The IAAP Handbook of Applied Psychology was published in 2011 by Wiley and Blackwell and it includes 33 chapters produced by authors from different cultural, linguistic and theoretical backgrounds.
