= Journal of Economic Psychology =

- Discipline: Behavioral economics
- Language: English
- Edited by: Carlos Alós-Ferrer and Eldad Yechiam

Publication details
- History: 1981–present
- Publisher: Elsevier
- Frequency: Bimonthly
- Impact factor: 3.5 (2022)

Standard abbreviations
- ISO 4: J. Econ. Psychol.

Indexing
- ISSN: 0167-4870
- LCCN: sf90090112
- OCLC no.: 07754472

Links
- Journal homepage; Online archive

The Journal of Economic Psychology is a bimonthly peer-reviewed academic journal covering behavioral economics. It was founded by Willem Frederik (Fred) van Raaij in 1981 and is published by Elsevier on behalf of the International Association for Research in Economic Psychology, of which it is the official journal. The editors-in-chief are Carlos Alós-Ferrer (University of Zurich) and Eldad Yechiam (Technion - Israel Institute of Technology). According to the Journal Citation Reports, the journal has a 2022 impact factor of 3.5.
