= Management Science (journal) =

Peer-reviewed academic journal

- Discipline: Management
- Language: English
- Edited by: Christoph Loch

Publication details
- History: 1954-present
- Publisher: Institute for Operations Research and the Management Sciences (United States)
- Frequency: Monthly
- Impact factor: 5.4 (2022)

Standard abbreviations
- ISO 4: Manag. Sci.

Indexing
- CODEN: MSCIAM
- ISSN: 0025-1909 (print); 1526-5501 (web)
- LCCN: 56021107
- JSTOR: 00251909
- OCLC no.: 01641131

Links
- Journal homepage; Online access; Online archive

Management Science is a peer-reviewed academic journal that covers research on all aspects of management related to strategy, entrepreneurship, innovation, information technology, and organizations as well as all functional areas of business, such as accounting, finance, marketing, and operations. It is published by the Institute for Operations Research and the Management Sciences and was established in 1954 by the institute's precursor, the Institute of Management Sciences. C. West Churchman was the founding editor-in-chief.

According to the Journal Citation Reports, the journal has a 2022 impact factor of 5.4.

== Editors-in-chief ==
The following persons are, or have been, editors-in-chief:

- 2024–present: Christoph Loch
- 2018–2023: David Simchi-Levi
- 2014–2018: Teck-Hua Ho
- 2009–2014: Gérard Cachon
- 2003–2008: Wallace Hopp
- 1997–2002: Hau L. Lee
- 1993–1997: Gabriel R. Bitran
- 1983–1990: Donald G. Morrison
- 1968–1983: Martin K. Starr
- 1960–1967: Robert M. Thrall
- 1954–1960: C. West Churchman

== Notable papers ==
According to Google Scholar, the following three papers have been cited most frequently:

- Sharpe, William F. (1963). "A Simplified Model for Portfolio Analysis". Management Science. 9 (2): 277–293. doi:10.1287/mnsc.9.2.277.
- Harsanyi, John C. (1967). "Games with Incomplete Information Played by "Bayesian" Players, I–III: Part I. The Basic Model&". Management Science. 50 (12_supplement): 1804–1817. doi:10.1287/mnsc.1040.0270.
- Bass, Frank M. (1969). "A New Product Growth for Model Consumer Durables". Management Science. 15 (5): 215–227. doi:10.1287/mnsc.15.5.215.
