= Colin Camerer =

American behavioral economist (born 1959)

Colin F. Camerer
- Born: December 4, 1959 (age 66); Philadelphia, Pennsylvania, US

Academic background
- Education: Johns Hopkins University (BA); University of Chicago (MBA, PhD)
- Thesis: The Validity and Utility of Expert Judgment (1981)
- Doctoral advisor: Hillel Einhorn; Robin Hogarth

Academic work
- Discipline: Behavioral economics Neuroeconomics
- Institutions: Northwestern University; University of Pennsylvania; University of Chicago; California Institute of Technology
- Website: Information at IDEAS / RePEc

Colin Farrell Camerer (born December 4, 1959) is an American behavioral economist, and Robert Kirby Professor of Behavioral Finance and Economics at the California Institute of Technology (Caltech).

== Background ==
A former child prodigy, Camerer received a B.A. in quantitative studies from Johns Hopkins University in 1976 (at age 16), followed by an M.B.A. in finance from the University of Chicago in 1979 and a Ph.D. in behavioral decision theory from that same institution in 1981 (at age 21) for thesis titled The Validity and Utility of Expert Judgment under the supervision of Hillel Einhorn and Robin Hogarth. Camerer worked at Kellogg School of Management at Northwestern University, Wharton Business School at the University of Pennsylvania, and the University of Chicago Booth School of Business before moving to Caltech in 1994.

Camerer's research is on the interface between cognitive psychology and economics. This work seeks a better understanding of the psychological and neurobiological basis of decision-making in order to determine the validity of models of human economic behavior. His research uses mostly economics experiments—and occasionally field studies—to understand how people behave when making decisions (e.g., risky gambles for money), in games, and in markets (e.g., speculative price bubbles).

He spoke at the Econometric Society World Congress in London on August 20, 2005, and at the Nobel Centennial Symposium in 2001 on Behavioral and Experimental Economics.

He is the author of "Behavioral Game Theory" published by Princeton University Press in 2003.

During the late 1990s and until mid-2008, Camerer began instructing college courses in fields such as Cognitive Psychology, Microeconomic Theory, Behavioral Economics, and Organizational Design. These courses were held at a variety of different universities, including the aforementioned California Institute of Technology and additionally New York University.

In September 2013, Camerer was named a MacArthur fellow.

== Fever Records ==
In 1983, Camerer started a record label called "Fever Records" as "an economics experiment". Bands that he signed to the label include the Dead Milkmen, Big Black and Get Smart!. The label was part of the Enigma Records group of labels.

Another Fever Records was founded in the 1980s in New York City to distribute rap records, and has no connection.

== Selected bibliography ==
- Camerer, Colin (2003). Behavioral game theory: experiments in strategic interaction. New York, New York Princeton, New Jersey: Russell Sage Foundation Princeton University Press. ISBN 9780691090399.
- Camerer, Colin; Bowles, Samuel; Henrich, Joseph; Boyd, Robert; Fehr, Ernst; Gintis, Herbert (2004). Foundations of human sociality: economic experiments and ethnographic evidence from fifteen small-scale societies. Oxford New York: Oxford University Press. ISBN 9780199262052.
- Camerer, Colin F.; Loewenstein, George; Rabin, Matthew, eds. (2004). Advances in Behavioral Economics. Princeton University Press. doi:10.2307/j.ctvcm4j8j. ISBN 978-1-4008-2911-8.
- Camerer, Colin; Loewenstein, George; Prelec, Drazen (2005). "Neuroeconomics: How Neuroscience Can Inform Economics". Journal of Economic Literature. 43 (1): 9–64. doi:10.1257/0022051053737843. ISSN 0022-0515.
- Bose, Devdeepta; Camerer, Colin (2021), "Trust and Behavioral Economics: Exploration of Trust Based on Game Theory", in Krueger, Frank (ed.), The Neurobiology of Trust, Cambridge University Press, pp. 36–53, doi:10.1017/9781108770880.004, ISBN 978-1-108-77088-0
