= Joan Silk =

American primatologist

Joan B. Silk
- Born: December 16, 1953 (age 72); Riverside, CA
- Education: University of California, Davis (M.A., Ph.D.)
- Scientific career
- Workplaces: Department of Biology, University of Chicago (1981-1983) Department of Anthropology, Emory University (1984-1986) Department of Anthropology, University of California, Los Angeles (1986-2012) School of Human Evolution and Social Change, Arizona State University (2012-current)
- Doctoral advisor: Peter S. Rodman

Joan B. Silk (born December 16, 1953) is an American primatologist, and Regents Professor in the School of Human Evolution and Social Change (SHESC) at Arizona State University . Her research interests include evolutionary anthropology, animal behavior, and primatology. Together with her anthropologist husband, Robert T. Boyd (also a professor in the same school), she wrote the textbook How Humans Evolved.

== Life ==
Silk was born in Riverside, California. She studied anthropology at the Pitzer College, Claremont Colleges, earning a bachelor's degree in 1975. She earned a master's degree in anthropology at the University of California, Davis in 1978 and completed her Ph.D. in anthropology from Davis in 1981. After postdoctoral research in the Department of Biology at the University of Chicago, she became an assistant professor at Emory University from 1984 to 1986. From 1986 to 2012, Silk was on the faculty of the University of California, Los Angeles Department of Anthropology and served as Department Chair for six years. She is currently a Regents Professor at the School of Human Evolution and Social Change at Arizona State University.

== Honors and awards ==
Silk is a Fellow of the American Academy of Arts and Sciences, a Fellow of the Animal Behavior Society, and a Fellow of the American Anthropological Association.

== Books ==
Silk is the coauthor or coeditor of:

- Boyd, Robert; Silk, Joan B. (2017). How Humans Evolved, Eighth Edition. W.W. Norton. ISBN 0393603458.
- Mitani, John C.; Call, Josep; Palombit, Ryne A.; Silk, Joan B., Eds. (2012). The Evolution of Primate Societies. ISBN 0226531724.
- Kappeler, Peter M.; Silk, Joan B., Eds. (2010). Mind the Gap: Tracing the Origins of Human Universals. ISBN 9783642027246.
