= Friendship Baptist Church =

Friendship Baptist Church may refer to:

- Friendship Baptist Church (Alabama), a Baptist church in Pine Apple, Alabama
- Friendship Baptist Church (Pasadena, California), a Baptist church in Pasadena, California
- Friendship Baptist Church (Washington, D.C.), a Baptist church in Washington, D.C
