= Robert Boyd (anthropologist) =

American anthropologist

Robert T. Boyd
- Born: February 11, 1948 (age 78); San Francisco, California
- Education: University of California, Davis; University of California, San Diego
- Spouse: Joan B. Silk
- Scientific career
- Fields: Anthropology; Ecology
- Notable students: Joseph Henrich, Richard McElreath

Robert Turner Boyd (born February 11, 1948) is an American anthropologist. He is professor of the School of Human Evolution and Social Change (SHESC) at Arizona State University (ASU). His research interests include evolutionary psychology and in particular the evolutionary roots of culture. Together with his primatologist wife, Joan B. Silk (who is also a professor in SHESC at ASU), he wrote the textbook How Humans Evolved.

== Life ==
Boyd was born in San Francisco. He studied physics at the University of California, San Diego (B.A., 1970). In 1975, he completed a PhD in ecology at the University of California, Davis. From 1980 to 1984, he was assistant professor of the Department of Forestry and Environmental Science at Duke University. Afterwards, he taught two years in the Department of Anthropology at Emory University. From 1988 to 2012, Boyd was on the faculty of the University of California, Los Angeles Department of Anthropology. He is currently a professor at the School of Human Evolution and Social Change at Arizona State University.

== PhD students ==
- Francisco Gil-White
- Joseph Henrich
- Natalie Henrich
- Richard McElreath
- Michelle Kline
- Stephen Le
- Sarah Mathew
- Cristina Moya
- Karthik Panchanathan
- Aimee Plourde
- Adam Wetsman
- Minhua Yan

== Books ==
- Boyd, Robert; Richerson, Peter (1985). Culture and the evolutionary Process. Chicago: University Of Chicago Press. ISBN 0226069338.
- Boyd, Robert; Silk, Joan B. (1996). How humans evolved. W. W. Norton. ISBN 0393932710. Also published by Fünfte Auflage in 2008.
- Boyd, Robert; Richerson, Peter (2005). Not by genes alone: how culture transformed human evolution. Chicago: University Of Chicago Press. ISBN 0226712125.
- Boyd, Robert; Richerson, Peter (2005). The origin and evolution of cultures. Oxford: Oxford University Press. ISBN 019518145X.
- Boyd, Robert; Henrich, Joseph; Bowles, Samuel; Camerer, Colin; Fehr, Ernst; Gintis, Herbert (2004). Foundations of human sociality: economic experiments and ethnographic evidence from fifteen small-scale societies. Oxford New York: Oxford University Press. ISBN 9780199262052.
- Boyd, Robert; Gintis, Herbert; Fehr, Ernst; Bowles, Samuel (2005). Moral sentiments and material interests: the foundations of cooperation in economic life. Cambridge, Massachusetts: MIT Press. ISBN 9780262572378.
- Boyd, Robert; McElreath, Richard (2007). Mathematical Models of Social Evolution: A guide for the perplexed. University of Chicago Press. ISBN 9780226558271.
- Boyd, Robert (2018). A Different Kind of Animal. Princeton University Press. ISBN 9780691177731.
