= Norman Foote Marsh =

American architect

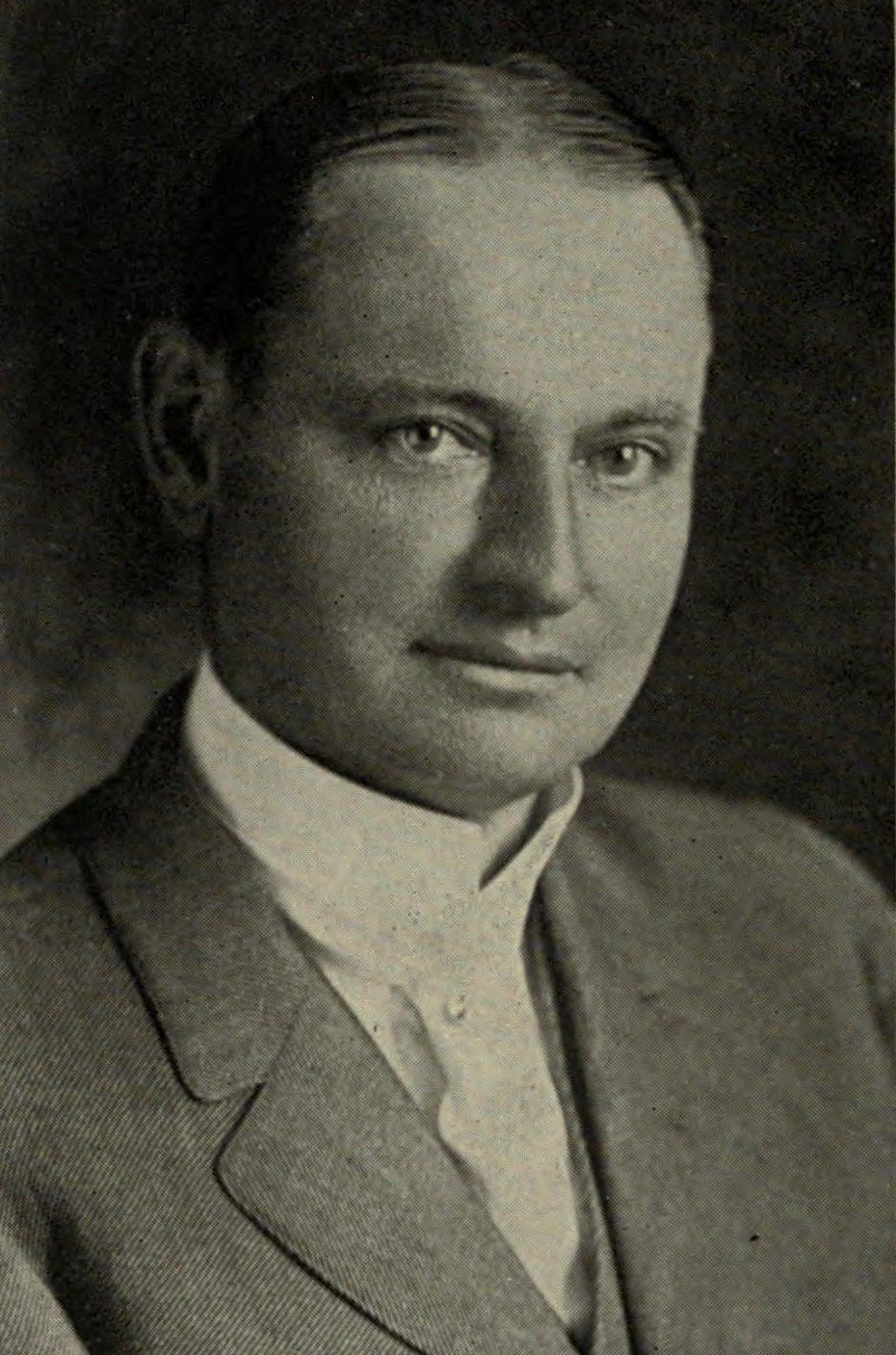
- Norman Foote Marsh, c. 1913
- Born: July 16, 1871; Upper Alton, Illinois
- Died: September 5, 1955 (aged 84); Pasadena, California
- Occupation: Architect
- Practice: Preston & Marsh; Marsh & Russell; Marsh & Howard; Marsh, Smith & Powell

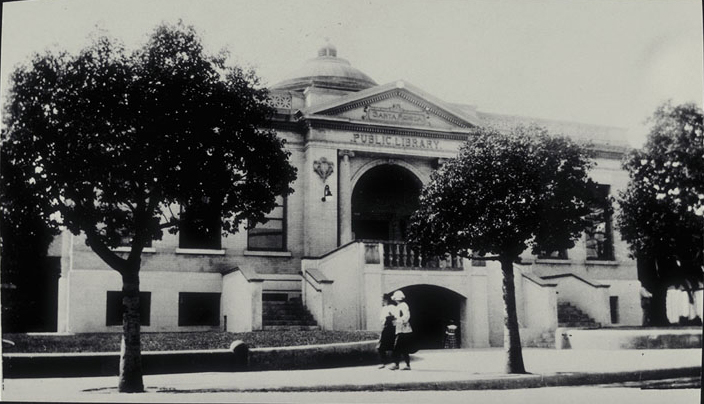
The former Santa Monica Public Library, designed by Marsh & Russell in the Neoclassical style and completed in 1904.

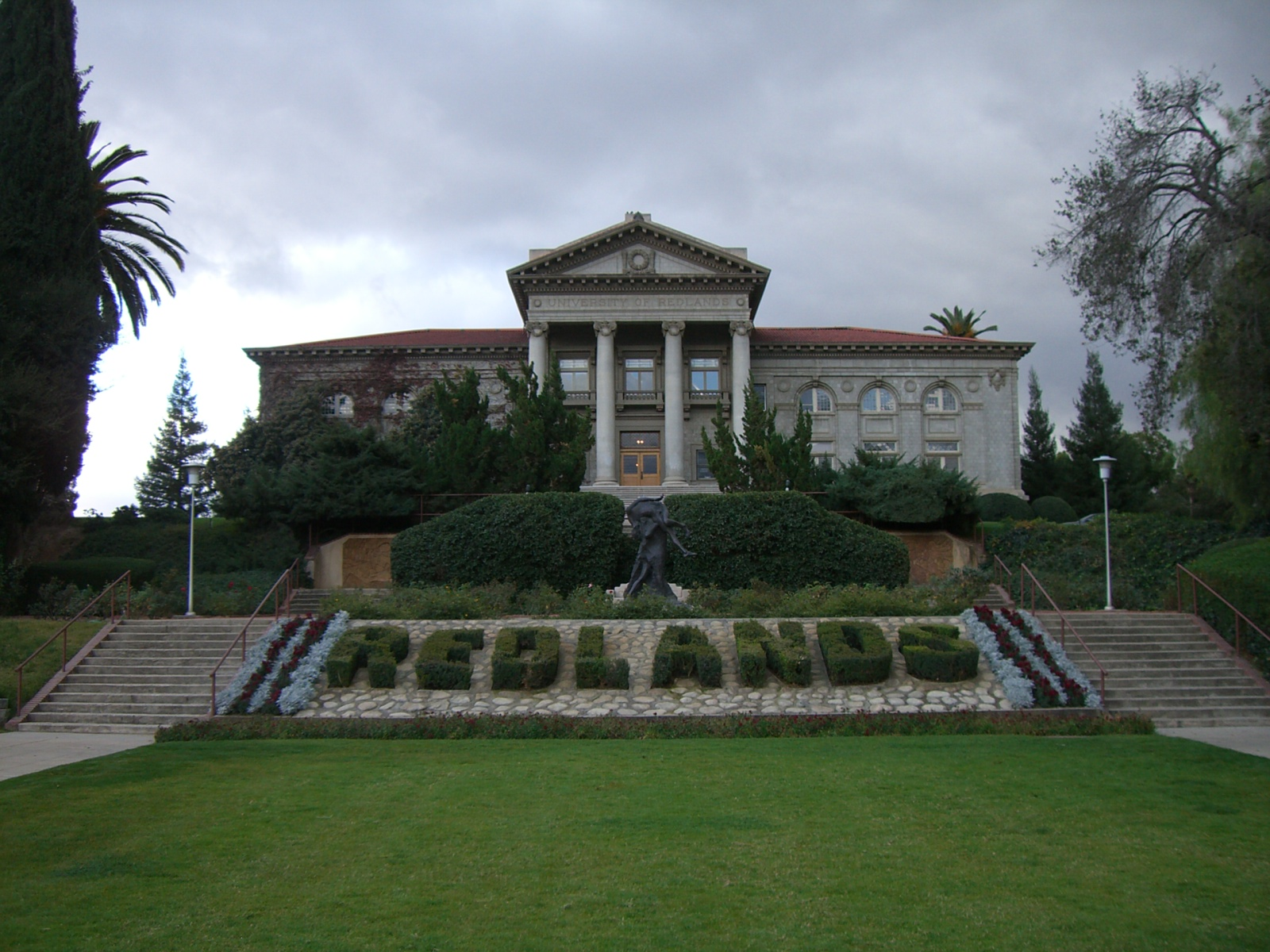
The Administration Building of the University of Redlands, designed by Marsh in the Neoclassical style and completed in 1910.

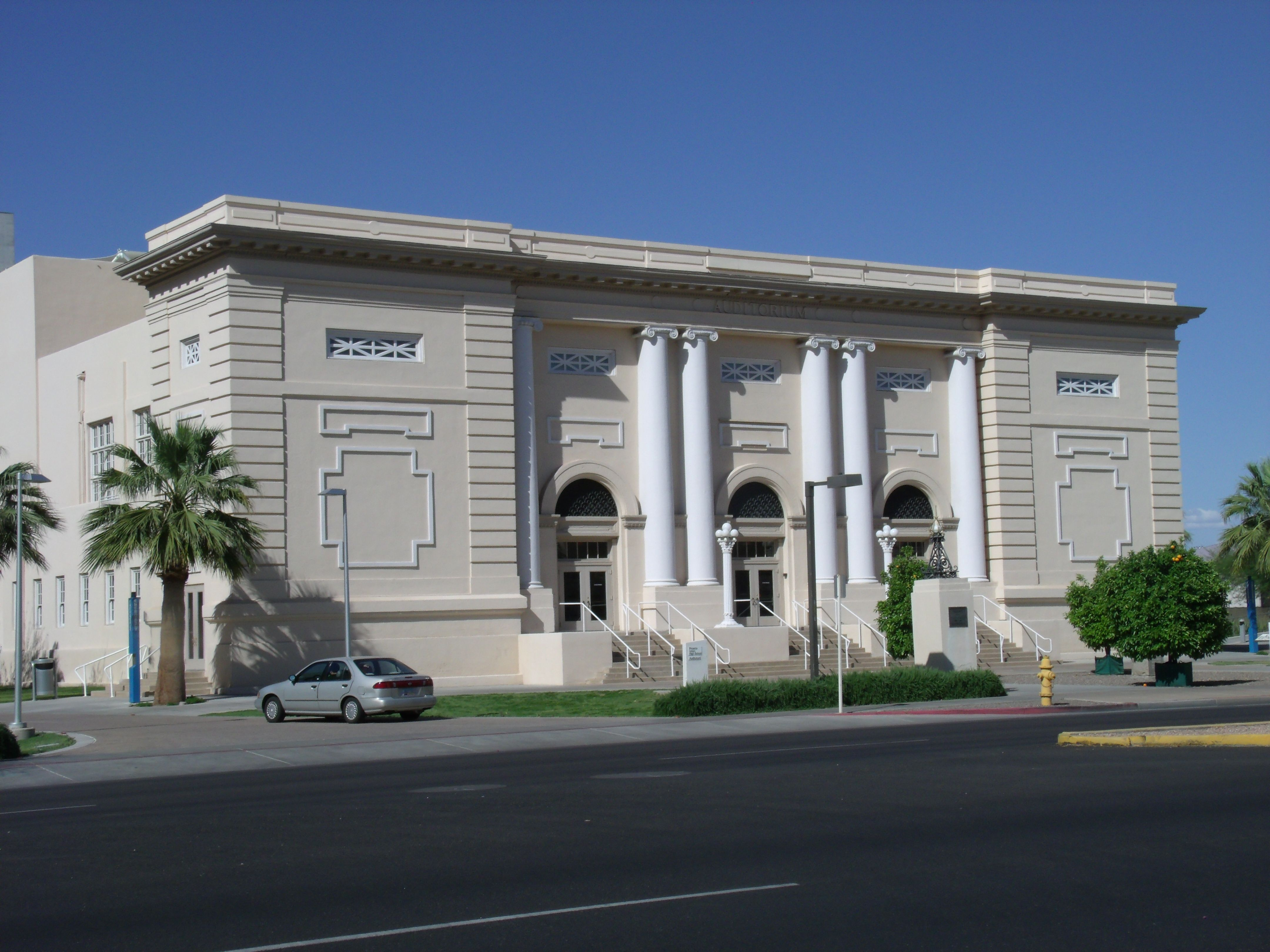
The auditorium of the former Phoenix Union High School, designed by Marsh in the Neoclassical style and completed in 1912.

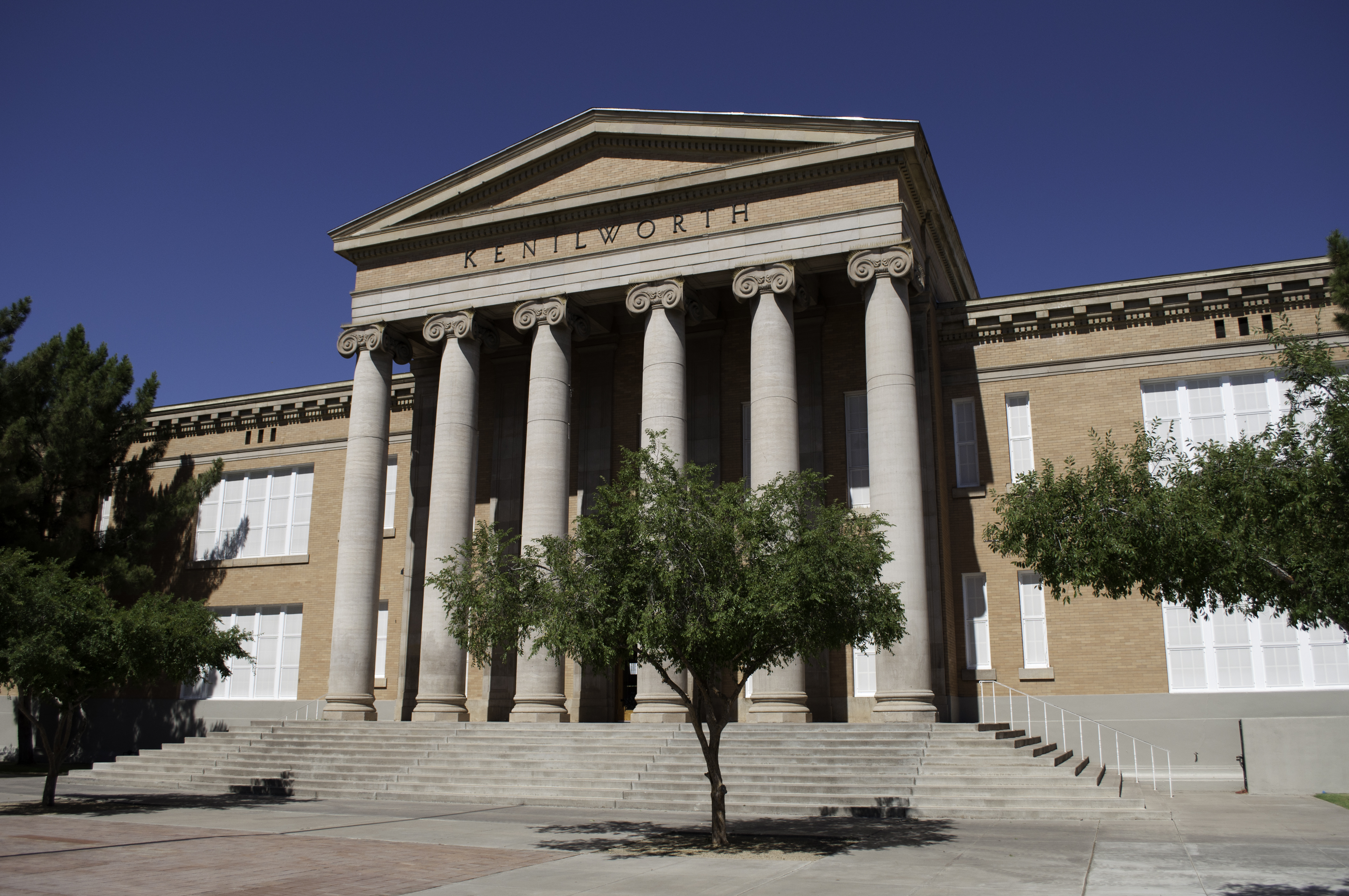
The Kenilworth Elementary School in Phoenix, Arizona, designed by Marsh in the Neoclassical style and completed in 1920.

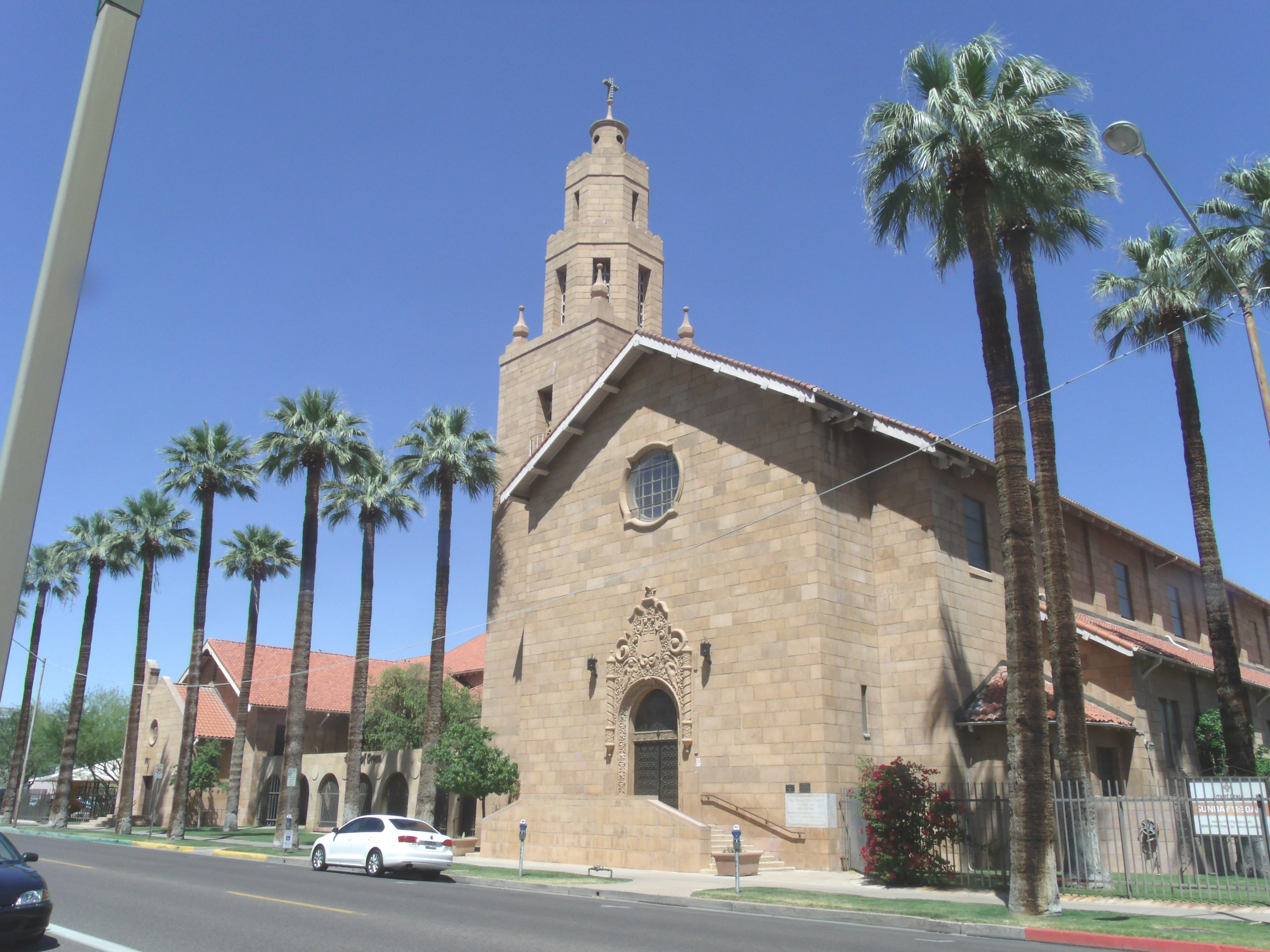
The First Presbyterian Church in Phoenix, Arizona, designed by Marsh in the Spanish Colonial Revival style and completed in 1927.

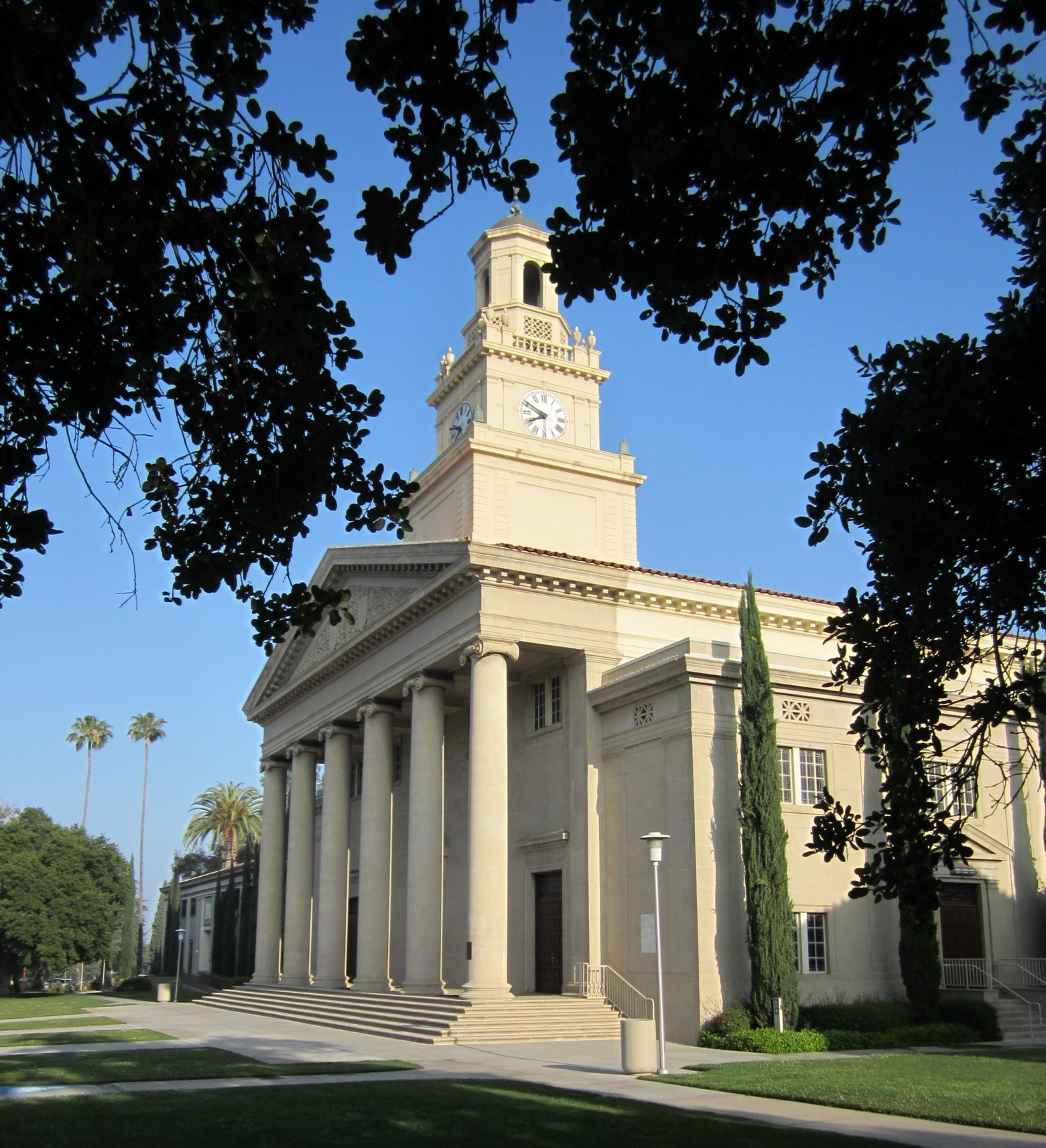
The Memorial Chapel of the University of Redlands, designed by Herbert J. Powell for Norman F. Marsh & Company in the Neoclassical style and completed in 1928.

Norman Foote Marsh (July 16, 1871 - September 5, 1955) was an American architect in practice in Los Angeles from 1900 until his retirement in 1945. He specialized in the design of schools and churches and worked mostly in California and Arizona. The firm he established in 1901 was active until its dissolution in 1997.

== Life and career ==
Norman Foote Marsh was born July 16, 1871, in Upper Alton, Illinois, to Ebenezer Marsh and Kate Marsh, née Provost. He was educated in the Upper Alton public schools and at Shurtleff College and the University of Illinois School of Architecture, graduating from the latter in 1897 with a BS in architecture. After graduation he joined the American Luxfer Prism Company, representing them in New York City, Chicago and Philadelphia. In 1900 he relocated to Los Angeles, where he formed the partnership of Preston & Marsh, architects, with J. N. Preston. This was dissolved after a year and he formed the new partnership of Marsh & Russell with Clarence H. Russell.

Marsh & Russell served as principal architects for the design and construction of the city of Venice in 1905, working for the developer Abbott Kinney. Venice's design includes canals and a central district along Windward Avenue with the look of an Italian Renaissance street.

Marsh & Russell was dissolved in 1907 and Marsh worked alone until 1915, when he formed Marsh & Howard with Herbert C. Howard, a long-time employee. This was dissolved in 1917 and Marsh was again a sole practitioner until 1927, when he formed Norman F. Marsh & Company with engineer David D. Smith and architect Herbert J. Powell. At this time Marsh settled into an administrative role in the firm, delegating engineering to Smith and architectural design to Powell. In 1928 Smith and Powell became full partners in the reorganized Marsh, Smith & Powell.

In 1912 Marsh established a branch office in San Diego under the management of architect V. O. Wallingford. In 1914 Marsh and Wallingford moved the office to Phoenix, Arizona. Wallingford opened his own office in 1919, though Marsh and Wallingford continued to collaborate on certain projects.

Marsh and his partners designed more than twenty churches in the Los Angeles area (in Pasadena, Glendale, San Jose, Long Beach and elsewhere) and at least seven in San Diego. He designed houses in Hollywood, Ojai and elsewhere for prominent persons. He designed dozens of elementary and secondary schools and several university buildings in Arizona and California.

== Personal life ==
Marsh was married in 1901 to Cora Mae Cairns of Polo, Illinois. They had two children, one son and one daughter. From 1902 he lived in South Pasadena, where he was active in the community, serving on the boards of the YMCA and the public library. In 1955, during a brief illness, he moved into a sanitarium in Pasadena to recuperate. Instead, he died there on September 5, 1955, at the age of 84.

== Legacy ==
Marsh retired in 1945, but his partners kept his name as part of the firm's until 1955, when they reorganized it as Smith, Powell & Morgridge, reflecting the addition of Howard H. Morgridge. Smith died in 1964, and in 1965 the firm was reorganized as Powell, Morgridge, Richards & Coghlan. In 1977 Powell retired and the firm was renamed Morgridge, Bader, Richards & Coghlan. In 1979 the firm was renamed a final time to Howard H. Morgridge FAIA & Associates and moved its offices out of the city proper to Tustin. After retiring from full-time practice Morgridge maintained the firm in a small way from his home in Balboa. It was dissolved in 1997.

A number of his works are listed on the National Register of Historic Places.

== Architectural works ==
=== Marsh & Russell, 1901–1907 ===
- 1904 – Santa Monica Public Library, (Note: Demolished or destroyed.) 503 Santa Monica Blvd, Santa Monica, California
- 1905 – City plan and buildings, Venice, California
- 1906 – Hollywood Public Library, Hollywood Blvd, Hollywood, California
- 1908 – South Pasadena Public Library, 1100 Oxley St, South Pasadena, California

=== Norman F. Marsh, 1907–1915 and 1917–1927 ===
- 1909 – Mesa Union High School, 260 S Center Ave, Mesa, Arizona
- 1910 – Administration Building, University of Redlands, Redlands, California
- 1910 – Azusa Public Library, 213 E Foothill Blvd, Azusa, California
- 1910 – Park Place Methodist Episcopal Church South, (Note: NRHP-listed.) 508 Olive St, San Diego
- 1911 – First Baptist Church, Garey and Holt Aves, Pomona, California
- 1912 – Phoenix Union High School (former), (Note: A contributing resource to the Phoenix Union High School Historic District, NRHP-listed in 1982.) 512 E Van Buren St, Phoenix, Arizona
- 1913 – First Baptist Church (former), 906 10th Ave, San Diego
- 1913 – Women’s Club of South Pasadena, 1424 Fremont Ave, South Pasadena, California
- 1914 – Bisbee High School (former), 100 Old Douglas Rd, Bisbee, Arizona
- 1914 – Industrial Arts Building, (Note: Designed by Norman F. Marsh, architect, with L. G. Knipe, associate architect. NRHP-listed.) Arizona State University, Tempe, Arizona
- 1914 – Monroe School, 215 N 7th St. Phoenix, Arizona
- 1916 – Jefferson High School, 1319 E 41st St, Los Angeles
- 1920 – Fourth Avenue Junior High School, 450 S 4th Ave, Yuma, Arizona
- 1920 – Kenilworth Elementary School, 1210 N 5th Ave, Phoenix, Arizona
- 1923 – Flagstaff High School, 400 W Elm Ave, Flagstaff, Arizona
- 1925 – Friendship Baptist Church, 80 W Dayton St, Pasadena, California
- 1926 – Roosevelt School, 201 6th St, Yuma, Arizona
- 1926 – Second Baptist Church, (Note: Designed by Paul R. Williams, architect, with Norman F. Marsh, associate architect. NRHP-listed.) 1100 E 24th St, Los Angeles
- 1927 – First Presbyterian Church, 402 W Monroe St, Phoenix, Arizona
- 1927 – Parkhurst Building, Santa Monica, California

=== Marsh & Howard, 1915–1917 ===
- 1918 – First Baptist Church, 6682 Selma Ave, Hollywood, California

=== Norman F. Marsh & Company, 1927–1928 ===
- 1928 – Memorial Chapel, University of Redlands, Redlands, California

=== Marsh, Smith & Powell, 1928–1955 ===
- 1928 – Sierra Madre Congregational Church, 170 W Sierra Madre Blvd, Sierra Madre, California
- 1930 – South Pasadena Public Library, 1100 Oxley St, South Pasadena, California
- 1935 – Hollywood High School, (Note: A contributing resource to the Hollywood High School Historic District, NRHP-listed in 2012.) 1521 Highland Ave, Hollywood, California
- 1935 – Roosevelt School, 801 Montana Ave, Santa Monica, California
- 1937 – South Pasadena High School auditorium, 1401 Fremont Ave, South Pasadena, California
- 1939 – El Monte High School, 3048 Tyler Ave, El Monte, California
- 1939 – Pier Avenue School (former), 710 Pier Ave, Hermosa Beach, California
- 1950 - Willow Glen Middle School (Formally Edwin Markham Junior High School) 2105 Cottle Ave, San Jose, California
- 1950 - Willow Glen High School, 2001 Cottle Ave, San Jose, California
- 1952 – Schauerman Library, El Camino College, Torrance, California
