= Industrial Arts Building =

Industrial Arts Building may refer to:

- Industrial Arts Building (Tempe, Arizona), listed on the NRHP in Maricopa County, Arizona
- Industrial Arts Building (Bowling Green, Kentucky), listed on the NRHP in Warren County, Kentucky
- Industrial Arts Building (Lincoln, Nebraska), listed on America's Most Endangered Places in 2010
