= Michael Wallerstein =

American political scientist (1951–2006)

- Born: January 16, 1951
- Died: January 7, 2006 (aged 54)
- Awards: Franklin L. Burdette Pi Sigma Alpha Award

Academic background
- Education: University of Chicago

Academic work
- Main interests: Political science

Michael Wallerstein (16 January 1951 – 7 January 2006) was an American political scientist and the son of psychoanalyst Robert S. Wallerstein and psychologist Judith Wallerstein. He was also the nephew of the American sociologist Immanuel Wallerstein.

== Education ==
Wallerstein received his undergraduate education at the Stanford University, majoring in political science and graduating in 1974. He received his graduate training in political science at the University of Chicago. After receiving his Ph.D. in 1985, he was affiliated with UCLA.

== Career ==
In 1994, he moved to Northwestern University, and finally moved to Yale University in 2004, where he was named as Saden Professor.

== Research ==
Wallerstein's research concerned inequality in advanced industrial societies. In particular, he studied the impact of labor market institutions, such as systems of collective bargaining, as well as the politics of income redistribution, such as social insurance and affirmative action.

He and Karl Ove Moene suggested that citizens don't see public pensions, unemployment insurance and sickness insurance as a form of residual redistribution from the rich to poor, but as a personal warranty to maintain their standard of living in the event of a job loss, an illness, or old age.

Wallerstein continued the school of thought founded by his dissertation advisor Adam Przeworski and inspired by the democratic theory of Joseph Schumpeter, along with Michael Wallerstein, Stathis Kalyvas, Jose Cheibub, Leonard Wantchekon.

== Awards ==
Wallerstein was awarded the Franklin L. Burdette Pi Sigma Alpha Award in 1985 for the best paper presented at the American Political Science Association's 1984 annual meeting, and he later served on the APSA executive council. In 2005, he was elected to the American Academy of Arts and Sciences.

== Selected bibliography ==
- Wallerstein, Michael (1985). Working class solidarity and rational behavior. Chicago: University of Chicago, Joseph Regenstein Library, Department of Photoduplication. OCLC 18226235. (PhD thesis)
- Wallerstein, Michael; Flanagan, Robert J.; Moene, Karl Ove (1993). Trade union behaviour, pay-bargaining, and economic performance. Oxford New York: Clarendon Press Oxford University Press. ISBN 9780198287988.
- Wallerstein, Michael; Bardhan, Pranab; Bowles, Samuel (2006). Globalization and egalitarian redistribution. Princeton, New Jersey: Princeton University Press. ISBN 9780691125190.
- Wallerstein, Michael (author); Various (editors) (2008). Selected works of Michael Wallerstein: the political economy of inequality, unions, and social democracy. Cambridge New York: Cambridge University Press. ISBN 9780521714853.
