= Parkhurst Building =

- U.S. National Register of Historic Places
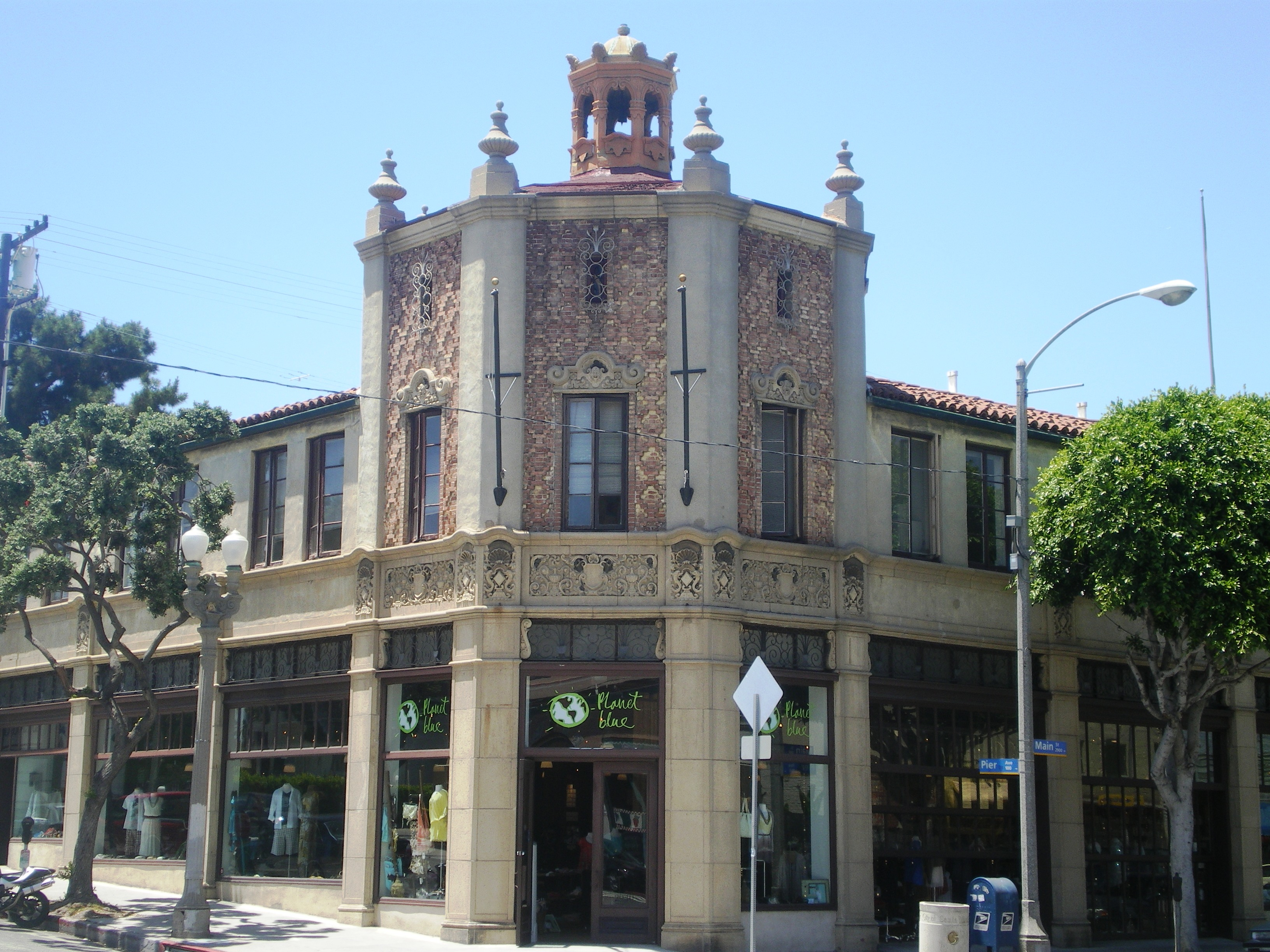
- The building in 2008

- Location within California
- Location: 185 Pier Avenue, Santa Monica, California
- Coordinates: 33°59′54.7″N 118°28′49.5″W
- Area: 0.2 acres (0.081 ha)
- Built: 1927
- Architect: Marsh, Smith & Powell
- Architectural style: Mission/spanish Revival
- NRHP reference No.: 78000699
- Added to NRHP: November 17, 1978

The Parkhurst Building is a historic two-story commercial building in Santa Monica, California. It was built in 1927 for Clinton Gordon Parkhurst, a realtor who served as the mayor of Venice, California in the 1920s. It was designed principally by Herbert Powell of Marsh, Smith & Powell in the Mission Revival style, with an octagonal tower, gargoyles above the second-story windows, and a cupola at the top. It has been listed on the National Register of Historic Places since November 17, 1978.
