= First Presbyterian Church (Phoenix, Arizona) =

Historic church in Arizona, United States

- U.S. National Register of Historic Places
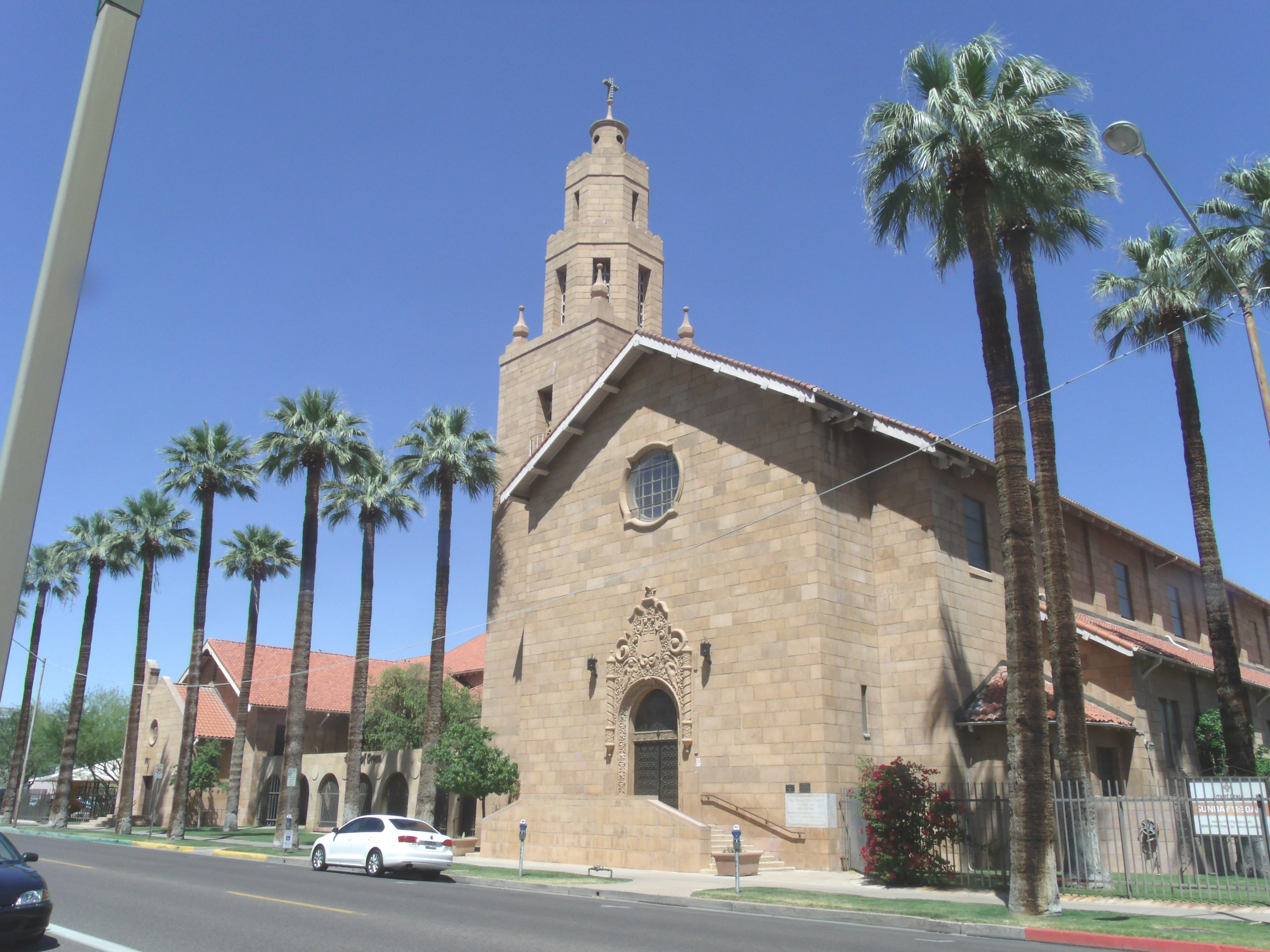

- Location within Arizona Location within the United States
- Location: 402 W. Monroe St., Phoenix, Arizona
- Coordinates: 33°27′2″N 112°4′43″W
- Area: less than one acre
- Built: 1927
- Architect: Norman F. Marsh
- Architectural style: Mission/Spanish Colonial Revival
- MPS: Religious Architecture in Phoenix MPS
- NRHP reference No.: 93000746
- Added to NRHP: August 10, 1993

The First Presbyterian Church in Phoenix, Arizona, is a historic church designed by architect Norman F. Marsh. Located at 402 W. Monroe Street, the church was built in 1927, in the Spanish Colonial Revival style. It was added to the National Register of Historic Places in 1993.

It is a U-shaped building 100 by 100 feet (30 m × 30 m) in plan.

In 2012, the building was acquired by City of Grace, a nondenominational church, to serve as their Phoenix campus.

== See also ==
- National Register of Historic Places in Maricopa County, Arizona
