= Herbert Gintis =

American economist (1940–2023)

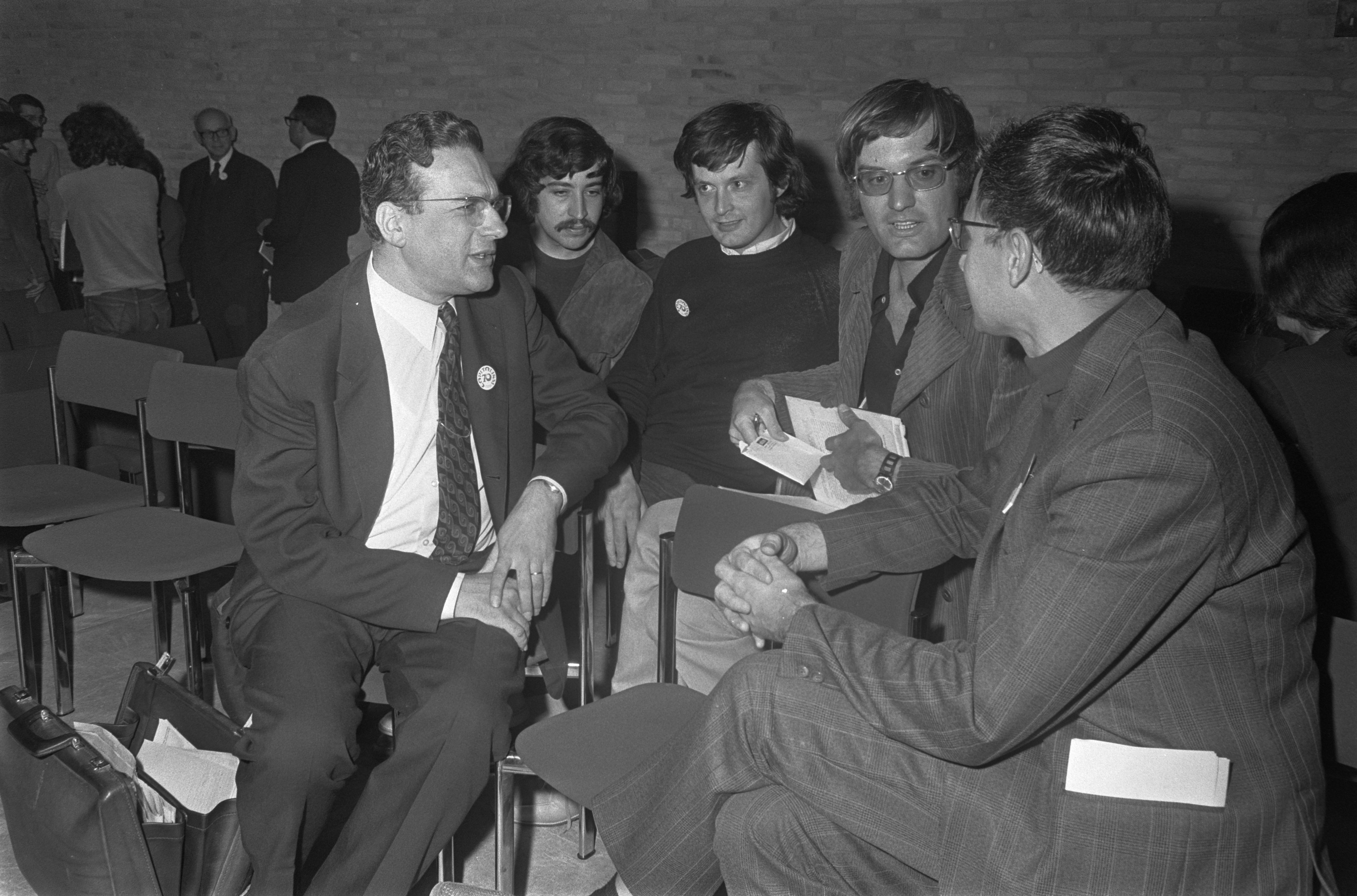
- Congress on Capitalism in the seventies, Tilburg, the Netherlands (1970). Left to right: Ernst Mandel, Herbert Gintis, Bob Rowthorn, Elmar Altvater and organiser Theo van de Klundert
- Born: Herbert Malena Gintis; February 11, 1940; Philadelphia, Pennsylvania, U.S.
- Died: January 5, 2023 (aged 82); Northampton, Massachusetts, U.S.

Academic background
- Education: University of Pennsylvania (BA); Harvard University (PhD)
- Thesis: Alienation and Power: Towards a Radical Welfare Economics (1969)
- Influences: Karl Polanyi, Samuel Bowles, E.O. Wilson

Academic work
- Main interests: Economics, behavioral science, sociobiology
- Notable works: Schooling in Capitalist America (1976); Democracy and Capitalism (1986); The Bounds of Reason (2009); A Cooperative Species (2011)

Herbert Malena Gintis (February 11, 1940 – January 5, 2023) was an American economist, behavioral scientist, and educator known for his theoretical contributions to sociobiology, especially altruism, cooperation, epistemic game theory, gene-culture coevolution, efficiency wages, strong reciprocity, and human capital theory. Throughout his career, he worked extensively with economist Samuel Bowles. Their landmark book, Schooling in Capitalist America, had multiple editions in five languages since it was first published in 1976. Their book, A Cooperative Species: Human Reciprocity and its Evolution was published by Princeton University Press in 2011.

== Early life and education ==
Gintis was born in Philadelphia, Pennsylvania, where his father had a retail furniture business. He grew up there and later in Bala Cynwyd (just outside Philadelphia). Gintis completed his undergraduate degree at the University of Pennsylvania in three years, one of which was spent at the University of Paris, and received his B.A. in mathematics in 1961. He then enrolled at Harvard University for post-graduate work in mathematics. After receiving his M.A. in 1962, he grew disillusioned with the subject area, and although still registered at Harvard, became a sandal maker with a shop in Harvard Square. During that time, he became very active in the student movements of the 1960s, including the Students for a Democratic Society and grew increasingly interested in Marxism and economics. In 1963, he switched his PhD program at Harvard from mathematics to economics, completing his PhD in 1969 with his dissertation, Alienation and power: towards a radical welfare economics.

== Career ==
He was subsequently hired as an assistant professor in the Harvard Graduate School of Education and then as an assistant professor and later associate professor in Harvard's Economics Department.

Towards the end of his postgraduate studies in economics, Gintis had come into contact with the economist Samuel Bowles who had returned to Harvard after research work in Nigeria. It was to be the beginning of a collaboration that lasted throughout their careers. In 1968, Gintis and Bowles were part of a group of graduate students and young faculty members at Harvard that included Michael Reich, Richard Edwards, Stephen Marglin, and Patricia Quick. The group held seminars to develop their ideas on a new economics that would encompass issues of alienation of labor, racism, sexism, and imperialism. Many of their ideas were tried out in a Harvard class which they collectively taught, "The Capitalist Economy: Conflict and Power". They also became founding members of the Union of Radical Political Economists.

In 1974, Gintis, along with Bowles, Stephen Resnick, Richard D. Wolff and Richard Edwards, was hired by the Economics Department at the University of Massachusetts Amherst as part of the "radical package" of economists. Bowles and Gintis published their landmark book, Schooling in Capitalist America, in 1976. Their second joint book, Democracy and Capitalism, published a decade later, was a critique of both liberalism and orthodox Marxism and outlined their vision of "postliberal democracy". Their most recent book, A Cooperative Species, was published in 2011. Like Gintis's 2009 The Bounds of Reason, the book reflects his increasing emphasis since the 1990s on the unification of economic theory with sociobiology and other behavioral sciences.

Gintis retired from the University of Massachusetts Amherst as professor emeritus in 2003. In 2014, he was a visiting professor in the Economics Department of Central European University where he taught since 2005, visiting professor at the University of Siena, a position he held since 1989, and an external professor at the Santa Fe Institute where he taught since 2001.

== Death ==
Gintis died on January 5, 2023, at the age of 82.

== Selected works ==
In addition to numerous scholarly articles and book chapters, Gintis authored or co-authored the following books:

- Gintis, Herbert; Bowles, Samuel (1976). Schooling in capitalist America: educational reform and the contradictions of economic life. New York: Basic Books. ISBN 9780465072309.
- Gintis, Herbert; Bowles, Samuel (1986). Democracy and capitalism: property, community, and the contradictions of modern social thought. New York: Basic Books. ISBN 9780465016006.

Also as: Gintis, Herbert; Bowles, Samuel (2011). Democracy and capitalism property, community, and the contradictions of modern social thought. London: Routledge. ISBN 9780415608817.

- Gintis, Herbert; Bowles, Samuel (2005). Unequal chances: family background and economic success. New York & Princeton, New Jersey: Russell Sage Foundation, Princeton University Press. ISBN 9780691136202.
- Gintis, Herbert (2009). The bounds of reason: game theory and the unification of the behavioral sciences. Princeton, New Jersey: Princeton University Press. ISBN 9780691140520.
- Gintis, Herbert (2009). Game theory evolving: a problem-centered introduction to modeling strategic interaction (2nd ed.). Princeton, New Jersey: Princeton University Press. ISBN 9780691140513.
- Gintis, Herbert; Bowles, Samuel (2011). A cooperative species: human reciprocity and its evolution. Princeton, New Jersey Oxford: Princeton University Press. ISBN 9780691158167.
- Gintis, Herbert (2016). Individuality and Entanglement: The Moral and Material Bases of Social Life. Princeton, New Jersey: Princeton University Press.

From 1997 to 2006, Gintis and anthropologist Robert Boyd co-chaired "Economic Environments and the Evolution of Norms and Preferences", a multidisciplinary research project funded by the MacArthur Foundation. Much of the research stemming from the project was published in two books co-edited by Gintis and other project members:

- Gintis, Herbert; Fehr, Ernst; Bowles, Samuel; Boyd, Robert (2005). Moral sentiments and material interests: the foundations of cooperation in economic life. Cambridge, Massachusetts: MIT Press. ISBN 9780262572378.
- Gintis, Herbert; Henrich, Joseph; Boyd, Robert; Camerer, Colin; Fehr, Ernst; Bowles, Samuel (2004). Foundations of human sociality: economic experiments and ethnographic evidence from fifteen small-scale societies. Oxford & New York: Oxford University Press. ISBN 9780199262052.
