= Robert S. Wallerstein =

Robert S. Wallerstein (January 28, 1921 – December 21, 2014) was a prominent German-born American psychoanalyst. He headed the Psychotherapy Research Project of the Menninger Foundation and was president of the International Psychoanalytical Association.

His parents, Sara Günsberg (born in 1895) and Menachem Lazar Wallerstein (born in 1890), were Polish Jews and both came from Galicja. Because of the World War I, they moved to Berlin, where in 1919 they got married. Two years later, Robert was born and his original name was Solomon. In 1923, Wallerstein family emigrated to New York, where his brother Immanuel was born. Robert S. Wallerstein was born in Germany, but at the List of alien passengers for the United States at the time of his family's emigration, his nationality was described as Polish.

Wallerstein was raised in The Bronx, then moved to Topeka, Kansas in 1949 and to Belvedere, California in 1966, where he died on December 21, 2014. He was predeceased by his son, the noted political scientist Michael Wallerstein and his wife Judith Wallerstein

== Writings (selection) ==
- Hospital treatment of alcoholism : a comparative, experimental study, New York : Basic Books, 1957
- Psychoanalysis and Psychotherapy: An Historical Perspective, International Journal of Psycho-Analysis, 1989, 70:563-591
- The talking cures : the psychoanalyses and the psychotherapies, New Haven: Yale University Press, 1995
- Lay analysis : life inside the controversy, Hillsdale, NJ: Analytic Press, 1998
- Forty-two lives in treatment : a study of psychoanalysis and psychotherapy: the report of the Psychotherapy Research Project of the Menninger Foundation, 1954-1982, New York : Other Press, 2000
- The Generations of Psychotherapy Research: An Overview. Psychoanalytic Psychology, 18:243-267 (2001)
- Psychoanalysis: The Broader Scope, International Universities Press, 2004
