= Samuel Bowles (economist) =

American economist (born 1939)

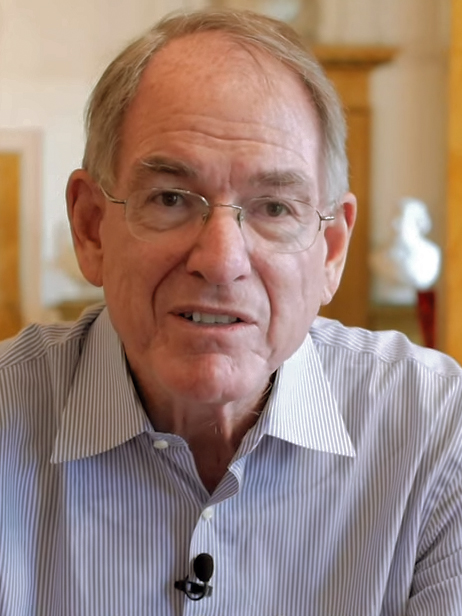
- Born: January 6, 1939 (age 87); New Haven, Connecticut, U.S.

Academic background
- Education: Yale University (BA); Harvard University (PhD)
- Influences: Karl Marx, Karl Polanyi

Academic work
- Discipline: Economic theory, microeconomics, social psychology
- School or tradition: Neo-Marxian economics, Analytical Marxism
- Institutions: University of Massachusetts Amherst
- Notable ideas: Schooling in Capitalist America

Samuel Stebbins Bowles (/boʊlz/; born June 1, 1939) is an American economist and professor emeritus at the University of Massachusetts Amherst, where he continues to teach courses on microeconomics and the theory of institutions. His work is associated with the neo-Marxian (variably called post-Marxian) tradition of economic thought. However, his perspective on economics is eclectic and draws on various schools of thought, including what he and others refer to as post-Walrasian economics.

== Biography ==
Bowles, the son of U.S. Ambassador and Connecticut Governor Chester Bowles, graduated with a B.A. from Yale University in 1960, where he was a founding member of the Yale Russian Chorus, participating in their early tours of the Soviet Union. Subsequently, he received his Ph.D. in economics from Harvard University in 1965 with the thesis titled The Efficient Allocation of Resources in Education: A Planning Model with Applications to Northern Nigeria. In 1973, the Economics Department of the University of Massachusetts Amherst, where Bowles taught until 2001, hired him along with Herbert Gintis, Stephen Resnick, Richard D. Wolff and Richard Edwards as part of a "radical package." Currently, Bowles is a professor of economics at the University of Siena, Italy and the Arthur Spiegel Research Professor and Director of the Behavioral Sciences Program at the Santa Fe Institute in Santa Fe, New Mexico. Additionally, Bowles continues to teach graduate-level courses in microeconomics at the University of Massachusetts Amherst.

In 2006, Bowles was awarded the Leontief Prize for his outstanding contribution to economic theory by the Global Development and Environment Institute. He was elected fellow of the American Academy of Arts and Sciences in 2020.

== Work ==
Bowles has challenged economic theories that free markets and inequality maximize efficiency and argued that self-interested financial incentives can produce behavior that is inefficient and violates a society's morality. He has argued that economies with less inequality, such as Asian countries, have outperformed economies with more inequality, such as Latin American countries.

=== Academic work and interests ===
On his website at the Santa Fe Institute, he describes his two main academic interests as first, "the co-evolution of preferences, institutions and behavior, with emphasis on the modeling and empirical study of cultural evolution, the importance and evolution of non-self-regarding motives in explaining behavior, and applications of these studies to policy areas such as intellectual property rights, the economics of education and the politics of government redistributive programs"; and the second being concerned with "the causes and consequences of economic inequality, with emphasis on the relationship between wealth inequalities, incomplete contracts, and governance of economic transactions in firms, markets, families and communities."

Bowles frequently collaborated with his former colleague Herbert Gintis (another Emeritus Professor of Economics from UMass Amherst), both of whom were asked by Martin Luther King Jr. to write background papers for the 1968 Poor People's March. In addition, he works with and is supported by the MacArthur Research Network on Preferences, the MacArthur Research Network on the Effects of Inequality on Economic Performance and the Behavioral Sciences Program at the Santa Fe Institute. Bowles was one of the founders of economics curriculum reform initiative CORE Project which seeks to update the undergraduate curriculum to integrate topics such as altruism, inequality and environmental economics. He is a member of its steering group. It has published a free, online open-access textbook called The Economy, for which Bowles is one of the authors.

Bowles is the author of numerous scholarly articles and books, among which A Cooperative Species. Human Reciprocity and Its Evolution (2011) and Schooling in Capitalist America, first published in 1976.

=== Selfishness vs. altruism ===
Bowles has recently studied the way that people are motivated by selfishness and the desire to maximize their own income as compared to altruism and the desire to do a good job and be well regarded by others. People act not only for material interests, but also "to constitute themselves as dignified, autonomous, and moral individuals."

Behavioral experiments suggest that "economic incentives may be counterproductive when they signal that selfishness is an appropriate response" and "undermine the moral values that lead people to act altruistically". Bowles gives the example of day care centers in Haifa, where a fine was imposed on parents who were late picking up their children at the end of the day. Rather than avoiding late pick-ups, parents responded by doubling the fraction of time they arrived late. After 12 weeks, the fine was revoked, but the enhanced tardiness persisted unabated. According to Bowles, this illustrates a "kind of negative synergy" between economic incentives and moral behavior, further stating: "The fine seems to have undermined the parents' sense of ethical obligation to avoid inconveniencing the teachers and led them to think of lateness as just another commodity they could purchase".

Bowles cites research by Ernst Fehr and others establishing that behavioral experiments modeling the voluntary provision of public goods show that "substantial fractions of most populations adhere to moral rules, willingly give to others, and punish those who offend standards of appropriate behavior, even at a cost to themselves and with no expectation of material reward". Diego Rivera's mural of factory workers at Ford's River Rouge assembly plant shows that according to Bowles organizations motivate members "by appealing to other-regarding motives such as the desire to do a good job and a sense of reciprocal obligations among members of a firm".

In most cases, "[i]ncentives undermine ethical motives" as they "may frame a decision problem and thereby suggest self-interest as appropriate behavior". Simply using market terminology offers justifications for actions that would otherwise be unjustifiable. Economic structures of societies produce people with different values. In a game in which individuals could choose how much to withdraw from a common pool ("the forest"), the withdrawal that maximized the gains of the group was substantially less than the withdrawal that maximized the gains of the individual. When subjects were trained in a game with incentives to be selfish, they continue to be selfish even when they play in a second game without those incentives. In a "regulation" model where individuals were fined for "overexploitation", their behavior was entirely self-interested. In a society, "if the relevant incentives allow the selfish to exploit the civic-minded, then the latter are less likely to be copied". Studies of 15 small-scale societies shows that "individuals from the more market-integrated societies were also more fair-minded" in that they made more generous offers and preferred to reject an unfair offer even at the cost of receiving nothing. In these societies, "individuals engaging in mutually beneficial exchanges with strangers represent models of successful behavior who are then copied by others".

=== Inequality vs. economic success ===
"What is the relationship between inequality and the economic success of nations, firms, and local communities?", Bowles asks. At the University of California, Berkeley, he and other researchers have challenged two views long held by most economists, namely that inequality goes hand-in-hand with a nation's economic success and that reducing economic inequalities inevitably compromises efficiency. For instance, he wrote that "East Asian countries with relatively level distributions of income have dramatically outperformed Latin American countries with less equal income distributions. Investments in the nutrition, health and education of poor children have produced not only more economic opportunity but higher economic performance. Indeed, emerging economic theory suggests that inequality may have adverse effects, blunting productive incentives and fueling costly conflicts between haves and have-nots".

The traditional debate has been polarized, Bowles said, between ideal models of equality that overlooked the role of incentives and idealized models of the private market that overlooked inequality.

The Berkeley group studied four questions:

1. How does inequality affect cooperation in local communities, and impact the local environment and other public goods, like irrigation water, neighborhood safety and other residential amenities, fisheries, forestry, and grazing lands?
2. How do inequalities affect the efficiency and productivity of farms, firms, and other entities, and are there more efficient forms of governance that can be promoted?
3. How do economic disparities among citizens affect bargaining, policy making, and economic performance at a national level?
4. What principles can guide the design of efficient and politically viable policies to alleviate poverty and enhance economic opportunity for the less well off?

== Publications ==
- Bowles, Samuel (1969). Planning educational systems for economic growth. Cambridge, Massachusetts: Harvard University Press. ISBN 9780674670907.
- Bowles, Samuel; Kendrick, David A. (1970). Notes and problems in microeconomic theory (1st ed.). Chicago: Markham Publishing. ISBN 9780841020122.
  - Also as Bowles, Samuel; Kendrick, David; Dixon, Peter B. (1980). Notes and problems in microeconomic theory. Amsterdam New York: North-Holland. ISBN 9780444853257.
- Bowles, Samuel; Gordon, David M.; Weisskopf, Thomas E. (1983). Beyond the waste land: a democratic alternative to economic decline. Garden City, New York: Anchor Press/Doubleday. ISBN 9780385183451.
  - Also as Bowles, Samuel; Gordon, David M.; Weisskopf, Thomas E. (1984). Beyond the wasteland: a democratic alternative to economic decline. London: Verso. ISBN 9780860918233.
- Bowles, Samuel; Gintis, Herbert (1986). Democracy and capitalism: property, community, and the contradictions of modern social thought. New York: Basic Books. ISBN 9780465016006.
  - Also as Bowles, Samuel; Gintis, Herbert (2011). Democracy and capitalism property, community, and the contradictions of modern social thought. London: Routledge. ISBN 9780415608817.
- Bowles, Samuel; Pagano, Ugo; Franzin, Maurizio (1999). The politics and economics of power. London New York: Routledge. ISBN 9780415185424.
- Bowles, Samuel; Gintis, Herbert (1998). Wright, Erik Olin (ed.). Recasting Egalitarianism: new rules for communities, states, and markets. London, England: New York Verso. ISBN 9781859842553.
- Bowles, Samuel; Arrow, Kenneth; Durlauf, Steven (2000). Meritocracy and economic inequality. Princeton, New Jersey: Princeton University Press. ISBN 9780691004686.
- Bowles, Samuel; Henrich, Joseph; Boyd, Robert; Camerer, Colin; Fehr, Ernst; Gintis, Herbert (2004). Foundations of human sociality: economic experiments and ethnographic evidence from fifteen small-scale societies. Oxford New York: Oxford University Press. ISBN 9780199262052.
- Bowles, Samuel (2006). Microeconomics: behavior, institutions, and evolution. Princeton, New Jersey Woodstock: Princeton University Press. ISBN 9780691126388.
- Bowles, Samuel; Gintis, Herbert; Osborne Groves, Melissa (2005). Unequal chances: family background and economic success. New York Princeton, New Jersey: Russell Sage Foundation, Princeton University Press. ISBN 9780691136202.
- Bowles, Samuel; Gintis, Herbert; Fehr, Ernst; Boyd, Robert (2005). Moral sentiments and material interests: the foundations of cooperation in economic life. Cambridge, Massachusetts: MIT Press. ISBN 9780262572378.
- Bowles, Samuel; Roosevelt, Frank; Edwards, Richard (2005). Understanding capitalism: competition, command, and change. New York: Oxford University Press. ISBN 9780195138658.
- Bowles, Samuel; Durlauf, Steven; Hoff, Karla (2006). Poverty traps. New York Princeton, New Jersey: Russell Sage Foundation Princeton University Press. ISBN 9780691125008.
- Bowles, Samuel; Wallerstein, Michael; Bardhan, Pranab (2006). Globalization and egalitarian redistribution. Princeton, New Jersey: Princeton University Press. ISBN 9780691125190.
- Bowles, Samuel; Bardhan, Pranab; Baland, Jean-Marie (2007). Inequality, cooperation, and environmental sustainability. Princeton, New Jersey: Russell Sage Foundation, Princeton University Press. ISBN 9780691128795.
- Bowles, Samuel; Gintis, Herbert (2011). A cooperative species: human reciprocity and its evolution. Princeton, New Jersey: Princeton University Press. ISBN 9780691158167.
- Bowles, Samuel; Gintis, Herbert (2011). Schooling in capitalist America: educational reform and the contradictions of economic life. Chicago, Illinois: Haymarket Books. ISBN 9781608461318. Original printed in 1976.
- Bowles, Samuel (2016). The Moral Economy: Why Good Incentives Are No Substitute for Good Citizens. New Haven, Connecticut: Yale University Press. ISBN 9780300163803.

== See also ==
- Capital accumulation
- Institutional economics
- Marxian economics
- Supply-side economics
