= Park Place Methodist Episcopal Church South =

Historic church in California, United States

- U.S. National Register of Historic Places
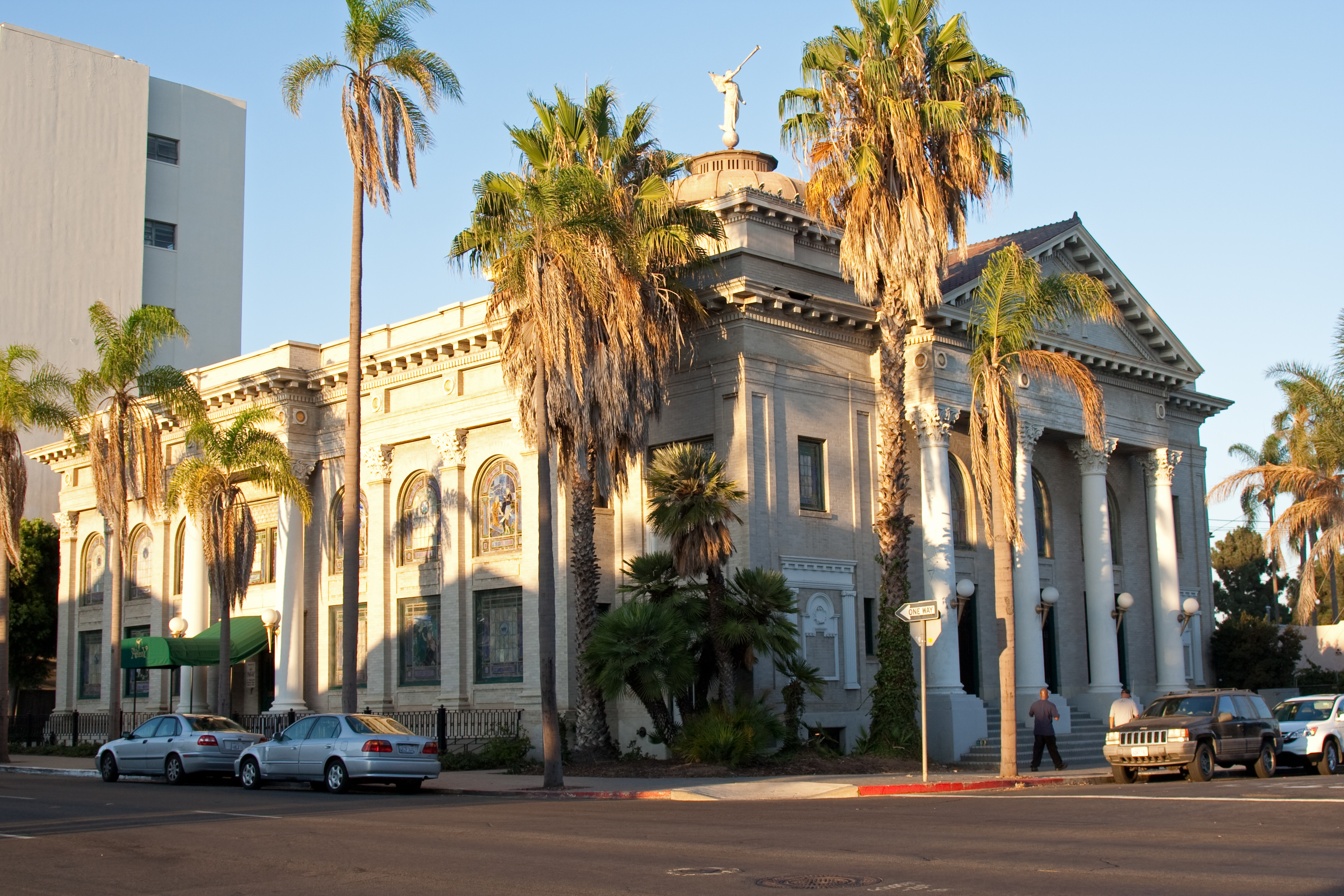

- Location within San Diego Location within San Diego County, California Location within California Location within the United States
- Location: 508 Olive St., San Diego, California
- Coordinates: 32°44′6″N 117°9′32″W
- Area: 0.3 acres (0.12 ha)
- Built: 1910
- Architect: Norman Foote Marsh
- Architectural style: Classical Revival
- NRHP reference No.: 83003432
- Added to NRHP: September 15, 1983

Park Place Methodist Episcopal Church South (also known as Balboa Park Place) is a historic Methodist church building at 508 Olive Street in San Diego, California. It is currently a special event facility known as The Abbey and managed by Hornblower Cruises

It was built in 1910 in a Classical Revival style and was added to the National Register of Historic Places in 1983.

It was designed by architect Norman Foote Marsh.
