= Robin M. Hogarth =

British-American economist (1942–2024)

- Born: 10 July 1942; Simla, British India
- Died: 21 April 2024 (aged 81)

Academic background
- Education: University of Chicago

Academic work
- Discipline: Behavioral economics
- Institutions: University of Chicago; Universitat Pompeu Fabra
- Awards: Honorary doctorate from the University of Lausanne (2007)
- Website: www.econ.upf.edu/~hogarth/Robin_M._Hogarth/Home.html; Information at IDEAS / RePEc

Robin Miles Hogarth (10 July 1942 – 21 April 2024) was a British-American psychologist and emeritus professor in the Department of Economics and Business at Universitat Pompeu Fabra in Barcelona, Spain. He served as president of both the Society for Judgment and Decision Making and the European Association for Decision Making. His previous positions include ICREA Research Professor at Universitat Pompeu Fabra and Wallace W. Booth Professor of Behavioral Science at the University of Chicago.

== Background and education ==
Robin Miles Hogarth was born in Simla, British India, on 10 July 1942, to British parents. He was schooled in Scotland at Glasgow Academy and Fettes College. Hogarth did not attend university as an undergraduate but trained to become a Chartered Accountant (1965) by serving an apprenticeship. He subsequently earned an MBA at INSEAD (1968) in Fontainebleau, France and, sponsored by a Harkness Fellowship, went on to gain a PhD at the University of Chicago (1972) under the supervision of Hillel J. Einhorn who had a major influence on his development and subsequent career but tragically died from cancer at age 45 in 1987.

Hogarth was a faculty member at INSEAD, the Booth School at the University of Chicago, and Universitat Pompeu Fabra in Barcelona. At Chicago Booth, he was Director of the Center for Decision Research (1983–1993), and Deputy Dean (1993–1998).

Hogarth died on 21 April 2024, at the age of 81.

== Main professional contributions ==
Hogarth's work centers on the psychology of judgment and decision making. Together with Hillel J. Einhorn, he published several key papers that helped establish the standing of a new area within psychology. Among other contributions were analyses of the role of rationality in decision making, the use of simple models, learning (and not learning) from experience, effects of ambiguity in decision making, and the probabilistic nature of causal judgments.

In 1985, Hogarth, together with economist Melvyn W. Reder, organized a 2-day conference at the University of Chicago on the topic of deviations from rational economic behavior. The conference was marked by the participation of many leading scholars (including 9 winners or future winners of the Nobel prize) who debated the meaning of data that did not comply with the assumptions of economic theory and yet were consistent with some psychological principles. This meeting and debate by highly qualified economists and psychologists has been recognized as an important milestone in the development of the disciplines of behavioral economics and behavioral finance.

Intrigued by the work of Gerd Gigerenzer and colleagues on the surprising efficacy of simple heuristic models for decision making, Hogarth undertook a series of theoretical analyses to understand why. These investigations were important in defining the possibilities and limits of some simple heuristic methods and emphasized the importance of characterizing the nature of environmental conditions appropriately.

In 2001, Hogarth published Educating Intuition (University of Chicago Press), a book that reviewed the psychological literature on intuitive judgment and offered suggestions on how this could be improved or “educated.” Key to this is the issue of the conditions under which intuitive responses have been learned and these, according to Hogarth, can vary from kind to wicked. Kind learning environments are characterized by repeated judgments and feedback that is both immediate and clear. Under these conditions, people acquire appropriate responses, i.e., intuitions. On the contrary, in wicked learning environments, feedback may be missing, slow, distorted or biased in other ways and the acquisition of appropriate responses is compromised. The differential effects of kind and wicked learning environments can have important consequences and these have been used to explain many important phenomena. In recent years, Hogarth has explored some of these in academic papers as well as a book.

Hogarth was awarded an Honorary Doctorate by University of Lausanne in 2007 and received the EADM Lifetime Contribution Award in 2023.

== Books ==
- Hogarth, R. M. (1979). Evaluating management education. Chichester, England: John Wiley & Sons.
- Hogarth, R. M. (1980). Judgement and choice: The psychology of decision. Chichester, England: John Wiley & Sons. (2nd ed., 1987).
- Hogarth, R. M. (Ed.) (1982). Question framing and response consistency: New directions for methodology of social and behavioral science, No. 11. San Francisco, CA: Jossey-Bass.
- Hogarth, R. M., & Reder, M. W. (Eds.) (1987). Rational choice: The contrast between economics and psychology. Chicago: University of Chicago Press.
- Hogarth, R. M. (Ed.), (1990). Insights in decision making: A tribute to Hillel J. Einhorn. Chicago: The University of Chicago Press.
- Goldstein, W. M., & Hogarth, R. M. (Eds.) (1997) Judgment and Decision Making: Currents, Connections, and Controversies. Cambridge, UK: Cambridge University Press.
- Hogarth, R. M. (2001). Educating intuition. Chicago: The University of Chicago Press. (Also published in Spanish as Educar la intuición: El desarrollo del sexto sentido. 2002, Barcelona: Paidós)
- Makridakis, S., Hogarth, R. M., & Gaba, A. (2009). Dance with Chance: Making Luck Work for You. Oxford, UK: Oneworld Publications.
- Soyer, E., & Hogarth, R.M. (2020). The Myth of Experience: Why We Learn the Wrong Lessons and Ways to Correct Them. New York: PublicAffairs.
