= Schooling in Capitalist America =

1976 book by Samuel Bowles and Herbert Gintis

- Author: Samuel Bowles, Herbert Gintis
- Publisher: Basic Books
- Publication date: 1976

Schooling in Capitalist America: Educational Reform and the Contradictions of Economic Life is a 1976 book by economists Samuel Bowles and Herbert Gintis. Widely considered a groundbreaking work in sociology of education, it argues the "correspondence principle" explains how the internal organization of schools corresponds to the internal organisation of the capitalist workforce in its structures, norms, and values. For example, the authors assert the hierarchy system in schools reflects the structure of the labour market, with the head teacher as the managing director, pupils fall lower down in the hierarchy. Wearing uniforms and discipline are promoted among students from working class, as it would be in the workplace for lower levels employees. Education provides knowledge of how to interact in the workplace and gives direct preparation for entry into the labour market.

They also believe work casts a "long shadow" in education – education is used by the bourgeoisie to control the workforce. From their point of view, schools reproduce existing inequalities and they reject the notion that there are equal opportunities for all. In this way, they argue that education justifies and explains social inequality.

The book is now considered the key text for the Marxist theory of sociology of education.

== Criticisms ==
Bowles and Gintis have been criticised:

- Philip Brown and Hugh Lauder (1991) argue that Bowles and Gintis have simplified the correspondence between education and the labour market. They go on further to state that there are changes in the importance of bureaucratic control in work organisations – it has reduced and there is an increased importance of team working.
- Michael Apple (1982, 1986) examined the hidden curriculum and concludes teachers are being proletarianised as the profession is de-skilled through the standardised curriculum. This increases state control over teachers and how they carry out their functions. He believes schools are sites of struggle and reproduction of inequalities persist. The formal curriculum is class biased. Reproduction of high status academic knowledge is prioritised through the schooling of those who are not poor or part of a minority. Textbooks neglect social conflict, which contribute to the ideological reproduction of capitalism.
- However Ramsey (1983) conducted a larger survey of schools and found a great deal of variation among working class schools.
- Hannan and Boyle (1987) argue the management and attitude of teachers control the ethos of a working class school, not all working class schools prepare their students for failing.
- David Reynolds (1984) – Bowles and Gintis ignore the influence of the formal curriculum. Much of the British school curriculum does not promote the development of an ideal employee under capitalism. The curriculum fails to teach skills needed by employers.
- Willis (1977) – Bowles and Gintis did not carry out detailed research into life in schools and they made assumptions that the hidden curriculum was actually influencing pupils. Many pupils had disrespect for the school rules and for the authority of the teacher. Working class "lads" learned to behave at school in ways that do not fit with capitalism's need for a passive workforce.
