= Pranab Bardhan =

Indian economist

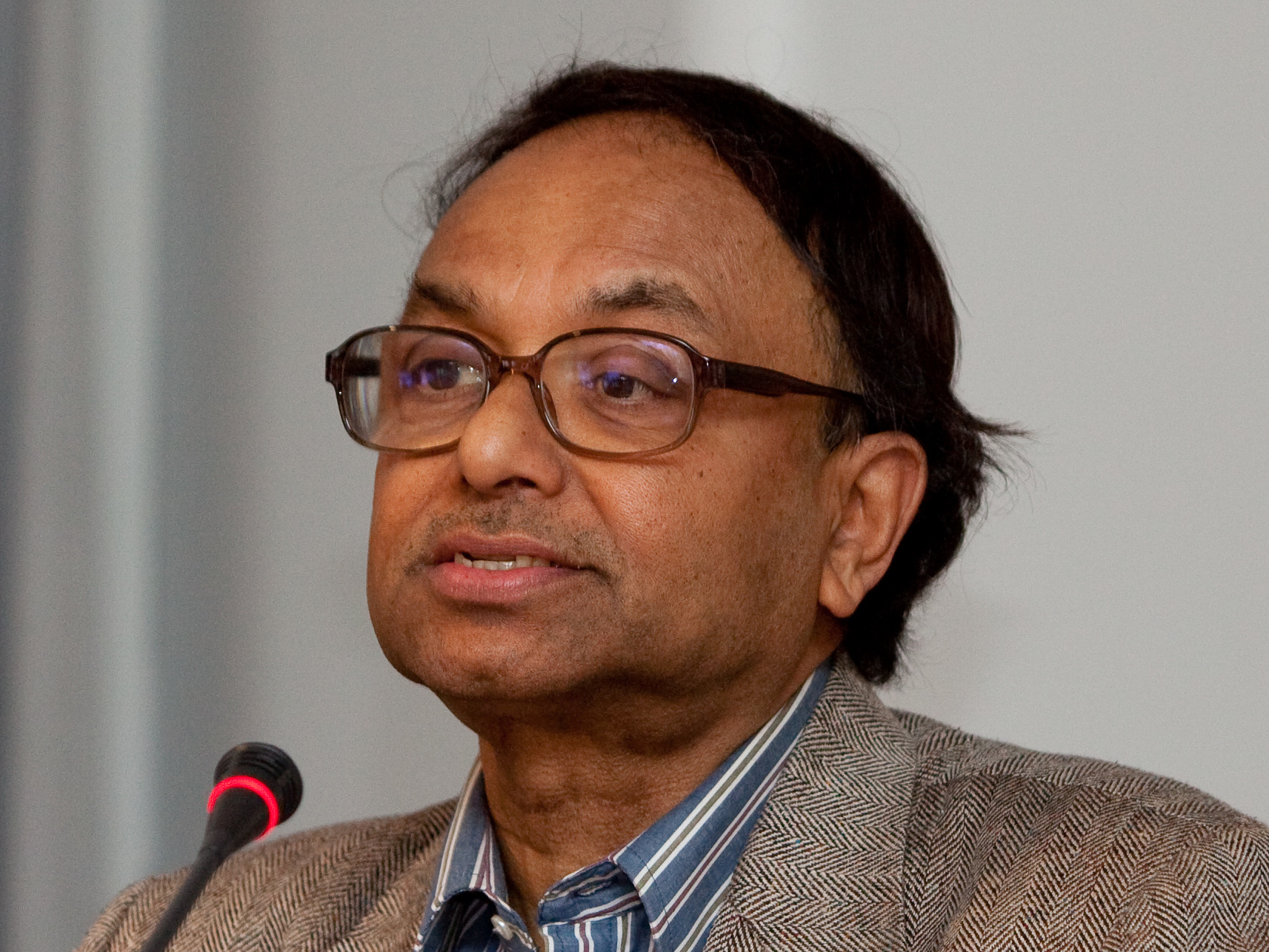
- Born: 11 September 1939 (age 87); Calcutta, Bengal Presidency, British India

Academic background
- Education: Presidency College, Kolkata (B.A.); University of Calcutta (M.A.); University of Cambridge (Ph.D.)
- Doctoral advisor: James Meade

Academic work
- Discipline: Development economics, political economy and international trade
- Website: Information at IDEAS / RePEc

Pranab Bardhan (born 11 September 1939) is an Indian economist who has taught and worked in the United States since 1979. He is Professor Emeritus of Economics at the University of California, Berkeley.

== Education ==
Bardhan received his bachelor's degree at Presidency College, Kolkata in 1958, his master's at University of Calcutta in 1960, and his doctorate at Cambridge University in 1966 with a dissertation entitled Economic Growth and the Pattern of International Trade and Investment: A Study in Pure Theory.

== Career ==
He taught at the University of Calcutta (1961–62), MIT (1966–69), Indian Statistical Institute (1969–72), the Delhi School of Economics of the University of Delhi (1973–77) and joined the Berkeley economics department in 1977. He has been Visiting Professor/ Fellow at London School of Economics, Trinity College, Cambridge, St Catherine's College, Oxford, and University of Siena, Italy.

His early work was on growth and trade theory. Subsequently, he has done theoretical and empirical research on rural institutions in poor countries, on political economy of development policies, and on international trade and globalisation. A part of his work is in the interdisciplinary area of economics, political science, and social anthropology.

He has been on the editorial board of a number of economics journals, including The American Economic Review (1978–81), the Journal of Economic Perspectives (1989–94), the International Economic Review (associate editor, 1971–1985), and the Journal of Development Economics (chief editor, 1985 to 2003).

He won a Guggenheim Fellowship in 1981 and the Mohalanobis Gold Medal of the Indian Econometric Society in 1980.

He is the author of 13 books, more than 150 journal articles, and the editor of 12 other books. His memoirs in Bengali have been serialised in the Calcutta literary magazine Desh.

Bardhan is also on the advisory board of FFIPP-USA (Faculty for Israeli-Palestinian Peace-USA), a network of Palestinian, Israeli, and International faculty, and students, working in for an end of the Israeli occupation of Palestinian territories and just peace. He also served on the inaugural Social Sciences jury for the Infosys Prize in 2009.

== Views ==
For Bardhan, equality of opportunity is more important than equality of income. Equality of opportunity depends on such factors as land distribution, education, and social equality. In his book The Political Economy of Development in India, Bardhan discusses the nature of dominant proprietary classes in India'. He claims that the industrial capitalist class, rich farmers, and the professionals in the public sector are the three main dominant classes in India which play a major role in influencing and designing public policy. He claims that there is a conflict of interests among these classes and they fight and bargain to get adequate share in the spoils of the system. This process of negotiation and bargain gives relative autonomy to the Indian state to exert its power.

Bardhan is famous for this prediction about China (2005):

"China's authoritarian system of government will likely be a major economic liability in the long run, regardless of its immediate implications for short-run policy decisions. source:Speech by Minister Mentor Lee Kuan Yew at the 37th Jawaharlal Nehru Memorial Lecture in New Delhi - India in an Asian Renaissance

== Selected works ==
=== Books ===
- Bardhan, Pranab K. (1984). Land, labor, and rural poverty: essays in development economics. Delhi New York: Oxford University Press Columbia University Press. ISBN 9780231053884.
- Bardhan, Pranab (1984). The political economy of development in India (1st ed.). Oxford, UK: Basil Blackwell. ISBN 978-0631135449.
- Bardhan, Pranab (1989). Conversations between economists and anthropologists: methodological issues in measuring economic change in rural India. Delhi New York: Oxford University Press. ISBN 9780195624328.
- Bardhan, Pranab (1989). The Economic theory of agrarian institutions. Oxford England New York: Clarendon Press Oxford University Press. ISBN 9780198287629.
- Bardhan, Pranab; Roemer, John (1993). Market socialism: the current debate. New York: Oxford University Press. ISBN 9780195080490.
- Bardhan, Pranab; Udry, Christopher (1989). The Economic theory of agrarian institutions. Oxford England New York: Clarendon Press Oxford University Press. ISBN 9780198286196.
- Bardhan, Pranab (2003). International trade, growth, and development: essays. Malden, Massachusetts: Blackwell. ISBN 9781405101400.
- Bardhan, Pranab (2003). Poverty, agrarian structure, and political economy in India: selected essays. New Delhi New York: Oxford University Press. ISBN 9780195661170.
- Bardhan, Pranab (2005). Scarcity, conflicts, and cooperation: essays in the political and institutional economics of development. Cambridge, Massachusetts: MIT Press. ISBN 9780262524292.
- Bardhan, Pranab; Wallerstein, Michael; Bowles, Samuel (2006). Globalization and egalitarian redistribution. Princeton, New Jersey: Princeton University Press. ISBN 9780691125190.
- Bardhan, Pranab; Mookherjee, Dilip (2006). Decentralization and local governance in developing countries a comparative perspective. Cambridge, Massachusetts: MIT Press. ISBN 9780262524544.
- Bardhan, Pranab; Bowles, Samuel; Baland, Jean-Marie (2007). Inequality, cooperation, and environmental sustainability. New York Princeton: Russell Sage Foundation Princeton University Press. ISBN 9780691128795.
- Bardhan, Pranab (2013). Awakening giants, feet of clay assessing the economic rise of China and India. Princeton, New Jersey Woodstock: Princeton University Press. ISBN 9780691156408.
- Bardhan, Pranab (2014). Memory scratching. Calcutta: Ananda Publishers. (A memoir.)

In Bengali as: Bardhan, Pranab (2014). Smṛti Kaṇduẏan. Kolkāta: Ānanda Publishers. ISBN 9789350403129.

=== Chapters in books ===
- Bardhan, Pranab (2009), "Economic reforms, poverty and inequality in China and India", in Kanbur, Ravi; Basu, Kaushik (eds.), Arguments for a better world: essays in honor of Amartya Sen | Volume II: Society, institutions and development, Oxford New York: Oxford University Press, pp. 350–364, ISBN 9780199239979.
