= Peter J. Richerson =

American biologist

Peter James Richerson (born October 11, 1943) is an American biologist. He is Distinguished Professor Emeritus of the Department of Environmental Science and Policy at the University of California, Davis.

== Life ==
Richerson studied entomology at UC Davis, earning his B.S. in 1965. In 1969, he completed his Ph.D. in zoology. After a postdoc and junior professorship, he was from 1977 until 2006 Professor of Environmental Science at UC Davis. He was a guest professor at University of California, Berkeley (1977–78), Duke University (1984), and the University of Exeter (2004). In 1991, he was a guest researcher at the Bielefeld University. He has made significant contributions to the study of biosocial and cultural evolution.

== Work ==
Richerson's research interests include sociocultural evolution, human ecology and applied and tropical limnology.

== Books (selected) ==
- Richerson, Peter; Boyd, Robert (1985). Culture and the Evolutionary Process. Chicago: University Of Chicago Press. ISBN 0226069338.
- Richerson, Peter; Boyd, Robert (2005). Not by genes alone: How culture transformed human evolution. Chicago: University Of Chicago Press. ISBN 0226712125.
- Richerson, Peter; Boyd, Robert (2005). The origin and evolution of cultures. Oxford: Oxford University Press. ISBN 019518145X.
