= Monroe School (Phoenix, Arizona) =

- Monroe School (Children's Museum of Phoenix)
- U.S. National Register of Historic Places
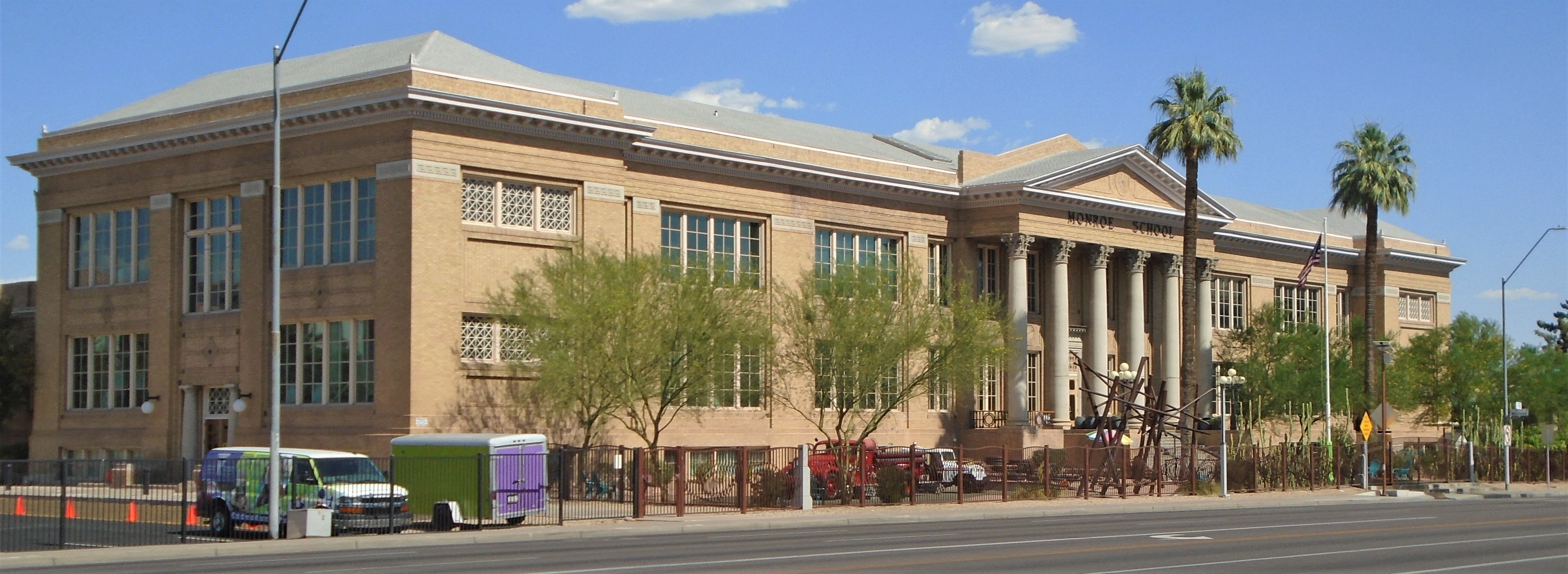
- The former Monroe School, now the Children's Museum of Phoenix (2021)

- Location within Arizona Location within the United States
- Location: 215 N. 7th St.
- Coordinates: 33.48°N 112.185278°W
- Built: 1914
- Architect: Norman F. Marsh
- Architectural style: Classical Revival
- NRHP reference No.: 77000237
- Added to NRHP: August 26, 1977

The Monroe School is a historic former school at 215 North 7th Street at the intersection of Monroe Street in downtown Phoenix, Arizona. It was designed by Norman Foote Marsh in the Neoclassical or Classical Revival style and was an elementary school and then a high school from 1914 to 1972. Later it was a Department of Defense recruiting center until 1988.

The building was listed on the National Register of Historic Places in 1977. Since 2008 the building has been the home of the Children's Museum of Phoenix.

== History ==
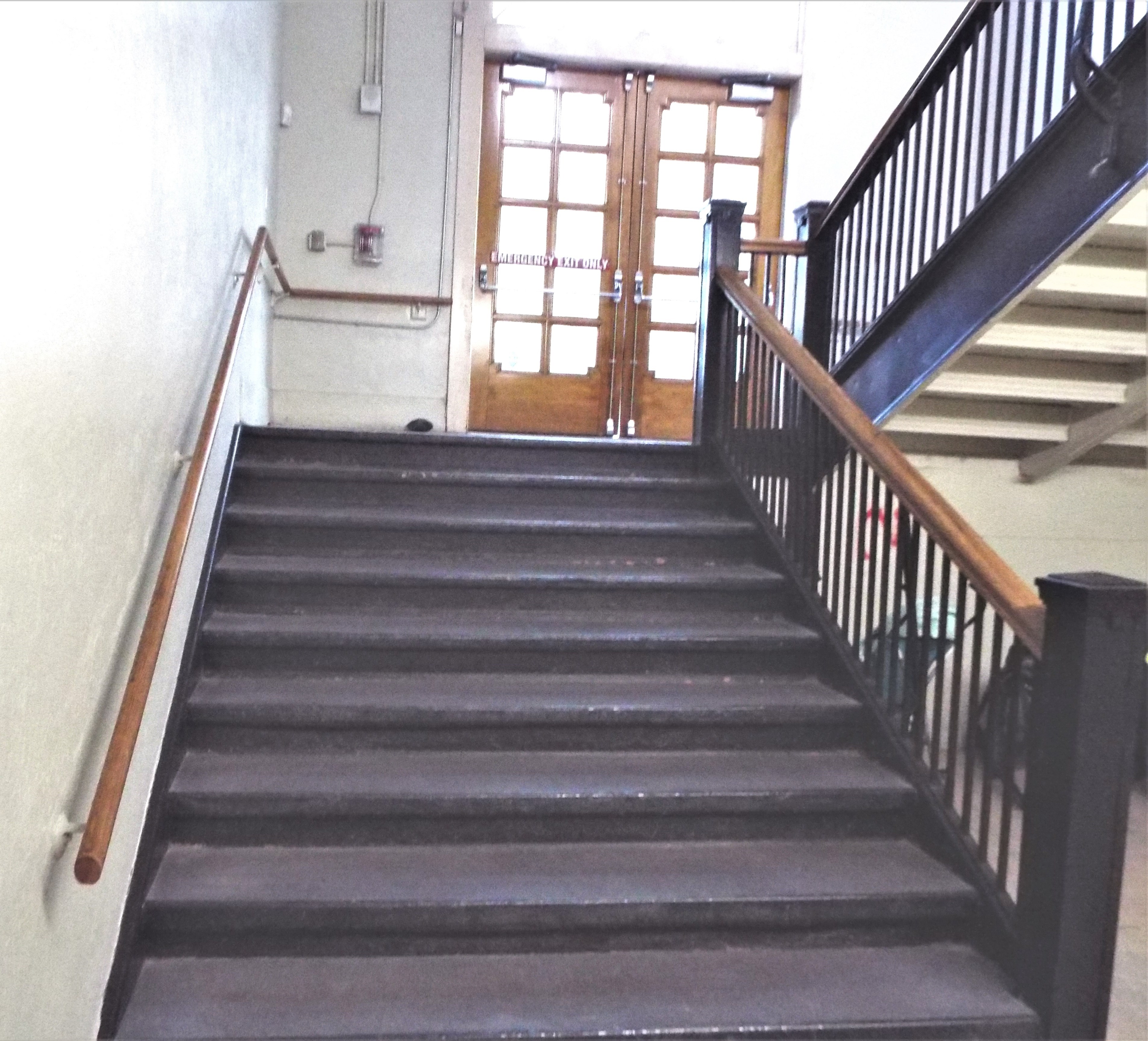
Original 1914 staircase

The school was built in 1914 at 215 North 7th Street in Phoenix. The three-story brick building, designed by Los Angeles architect Norman Foote Marsh in 1913, was built in the architecture style known as Neoclassical architecture. When the school officially opened in 1914, it was the largest elementary school west of the Mississippi River.

Throughout the years the building served as an educational institution for thousands of children. Eventually, the urban-renewal projects of the 1960s played a significant part in the resettlement of many families to new areas, causing a decrease in the school's enrollment. The school closed as an educational institution in 1972.

On August 26, 1977, Monroe School was listed in the National Register of Historic Places, reference #77000237. The building was later used as a Department of Defense recruiting center after it went through some remodeling, however, in 1998, the building closed once again.

== Children's Museum of Phoenix ==
In 1998, a small group of volunteers founded the Phoenix Family Museum. The group found support from the Phoenix Legislature who approved $10.5 million in bond funds to purchase and partially renovate the historic Monroe School. The renovation of the building began in 2006. The school became the new home of the Phoenix Family Museum which was renamed "Children's Museum of Phoenix" on June 14, 2008, the same day that the museum opened to the public.

Inside the museum there were many exhibits and activities which encourage an interaction between parents and children. Included is a whole wall of glittery CDs suspended from the ceiling. Among the activities which both parents and children can participate is what is known as the "Noodle Forest", which consists of a thicket of towering Styrofoam tubes. In 2015, the Children's Museum of Phoenix was recognized as one of the top three children's museums in the United States.

== See also ==
- List of museums in Arizona
- List of historic properties in Phoenix, Arizona
