= Santa Monica Public Library =

Public library system in California, US

Coordinates: 34.018535°N 118.493362°W

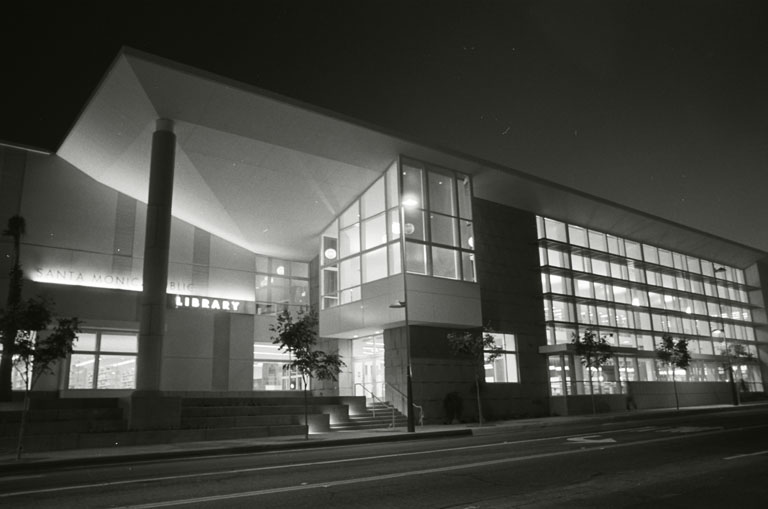
- Location: Santa Monica, California, United States
- Type: Public
- Established: 1890

Collection
- Size: 385,000+

Access and use
- Circulation: 1 million+
- Population served: 92,472

Other information
- Budget: $6,804,960
- Director: Maria Taesil Hudson Carpenter
- Employees: 93
- Website: smpl.org

The Santa Monica Public Library (SMPL) is the public library serving residents of Santa Monica, California and surrounding areas. SMPL is directed by a City Librarian, who reports to the Santa Monica City Manager's Office and is overseen by a Library Board consisting of five members appointed by the Santa Monica City Council.

== Services ==
The system consists of the Main Library, located at 601 Santa Monica Boulevard, and four branch libraries: the Fairview Branch (2101 Ocean Park Boulevard), the Montana Avenue Branch (1704 Montana Avenue), the Ocean Park Branch (2601 Main Street), and the Pico Branch (2201 Pico Boulevard).

Library cards are available free of charge to California residents. Library cardholders may borrow books, magazines, compact discs, DVDs, audiobooks, ebooks and can use their cards to access research databases. Public access Internet computers are available at all locations and can be accessed by both California residents and visitors, and libraries also offer free Wi-Fi. The Main Library and Pico Branch Library have several small group study rooms available free of charge to library cardholders. Each library location has one or more community meeting rooms which can be rented for a fee.

The library has an active schedule of public programs, including regular book discussion groups, computer training classes, music performances and frequent author appearances. The Santa Monica Reads program and Green Prize for Sustainable Literature are two of the Library's most prominent recurring programs. The Youth Services Department maintains a full roster of storytimes, special events, and a popular annual summer reading program.

The Main Library's Santa Monica Collection Room contains publications relating to the Santa Monica Bay region. The website Imagine Santa Monica contains the library's collections of digitized historical assets, including thousands of scanned photographs, historic postcards, maps, early editions of the Santa Monica Outlook newspaper and a selective newspaper index of the Outlook's later years. The SMPL owns a complete run of the Outlook (1875–1998) on microfilm.

== History ==
=== Origins ===
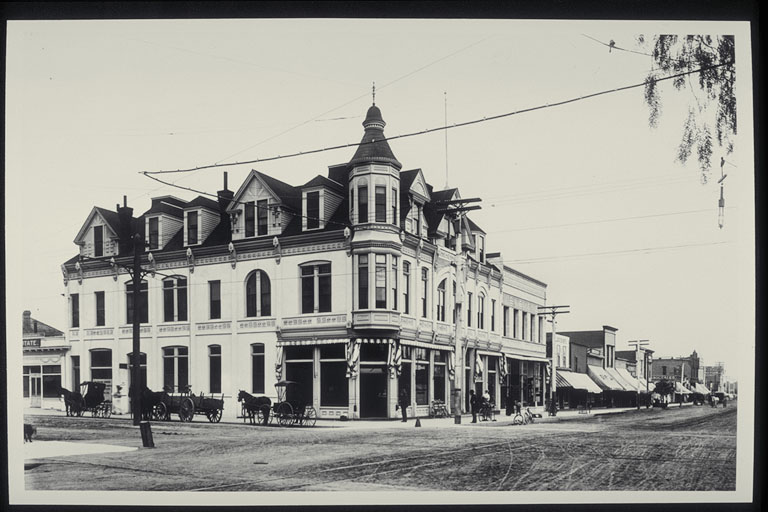
Bank of Santa Monica Building, which housed the Santa Monica Public Library in 1890

Santa Monica officially became a town in 1875. In 1884, a room adjoining Dr. Fred C. McKinnie's drug store was established as a reading room. The reading room was turned over to the Women's Christian Temperance Union (WCTU) in 1888. At that time, the collection of books contained 400 items, plus popular magazines and newspapers. Despite some successful fundraising events, maintaining the reading room proved challenging for the WCTU.

In November 1890, the WCTU proposed to turn the library, now numbering 800 volumes, over to the city of Santa Monica. The town trustees accepted the gift. In December 1890, the first City Librarian, Ms. Elfie Mosse, was appointed. Two rooms in the Bank of Santa Monica building, located at Oregon Avenue (later Santa Monica Boulevard) and Third Street, were set aside for the library.

Use of the reading rooms was free of charge, but borrowing privileges cost 25 cents per month. In March 1893, the library was made free to the public. By this time, the library had 1,800 volumes. By 1898, the library expanded to include another room.

In March 1903, the library moved to the new City Hall, located at Fourth Street and Oregon Avenue (later Santa Monica Boulevard), which provided more space.

=== The Carnegie library buildings ===
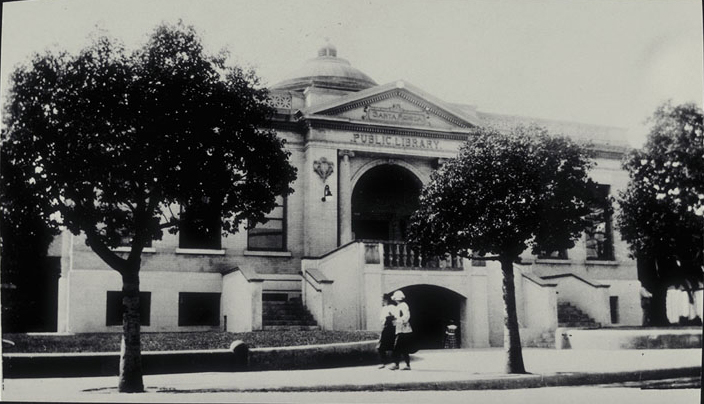
The 1904 Carnegie library building located at 503 Santa Monica Boulevard (Demolished)

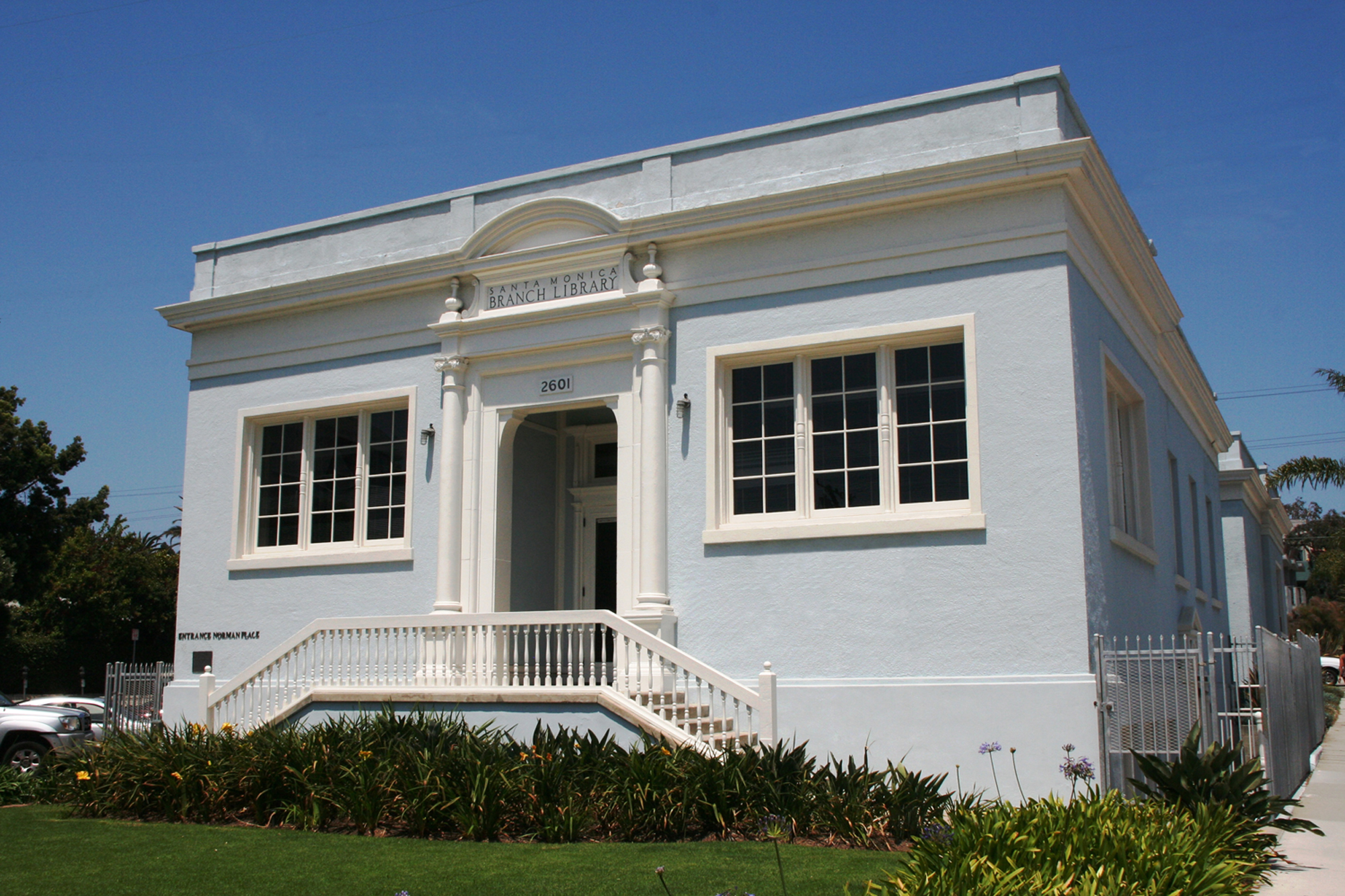
Ocean Park Branch library as it appeared in 2011)

As the city grew, so did the library's collection. In early 1903, Mrs. J. H. Clark wrote to Andrew Carnegie, making a plea for a library building in Santa Monica. Carnegie's reply in April 1903 stated in part: "... Mr. Carnegie will be pleased to furnish Twelve Thousand Five Hundred Dollars to erect a Free Public Library Building for Santa Monica."

Within a short time, the citizens raised $3982.50 and purchased a lot on the northeast corner of Oregon Avenue and Fifth Street. Work began on the building in January 1904. The library opened to the public eight months later, on August 11.

According to the 1912–13 library annual report, the collection had increased to 18,568 volumes and annual circulation totaled 80,666. The collection was already beginning to outgrow the building.

The need for branch libraries also became evident. The mayor wrote to the Carnegie Corporation requesting a grant to help with construction costs of a branch library. Carnegie granted $12,500. The Ocean Park branch library, located on a parcel of land on the northeast corner of Ocean Park Boulevard and Main Street that the city had purchased for $8,000, opened to the public on February 15, 1918.

=== The main library in the 1920s and 1930s ===
In 1926, a bond issue was passed in the sum of $50,000 for the reconstruction and expansion of the Main library located at Santa Monica Boulevard and Fifth Street. The small Carnegie-funded structure was enlarged and remodeled into a Spanish-style design by E. J. Baume, with two additional wings. The expanded Main library opened to the public on November 18, 1927.

One of the unique features of the remodeled Main Library (located at 503 Santa Monica Boulevard) was the mural by artist Stanton Macdonald-Wright. Commissioned by the Public Works Administration Project, Macdonald-Wright began work on the mural in February 1934. It took him 18 months to complete the project. Unveiled in 1935, the 2,000-square-foot composition made a lasting impression on visitors to the library.

Children's books illustrator Eulalie Wilson painted the murals for the Boys and Girls Room in the Main library. Peter Pan, Cinderella, and other characters from children's books would grace the walls of the children's section for more than two decades.

=== Further development of branch libraries ===
By 1930, Santa Monica had a population of 37,000. It had a hospital, junior college, and was home to the new Douglas Aircraft Company and Clover Field. On July 1, 1931, the Fairview Heights branch library opened. Located at 1903 20th Street, it was a 15-foot wide storefront branch, sandwiched between a grocery store and barber shop.

By 1942, it was clear the storefront Fairview Branch Library could no longer adequately handle increased patronage, and the library began to look for a more suitable location. On July 13, 1942, Fairview Branch Library opened in its second location at 2030 Pico Boulevard.

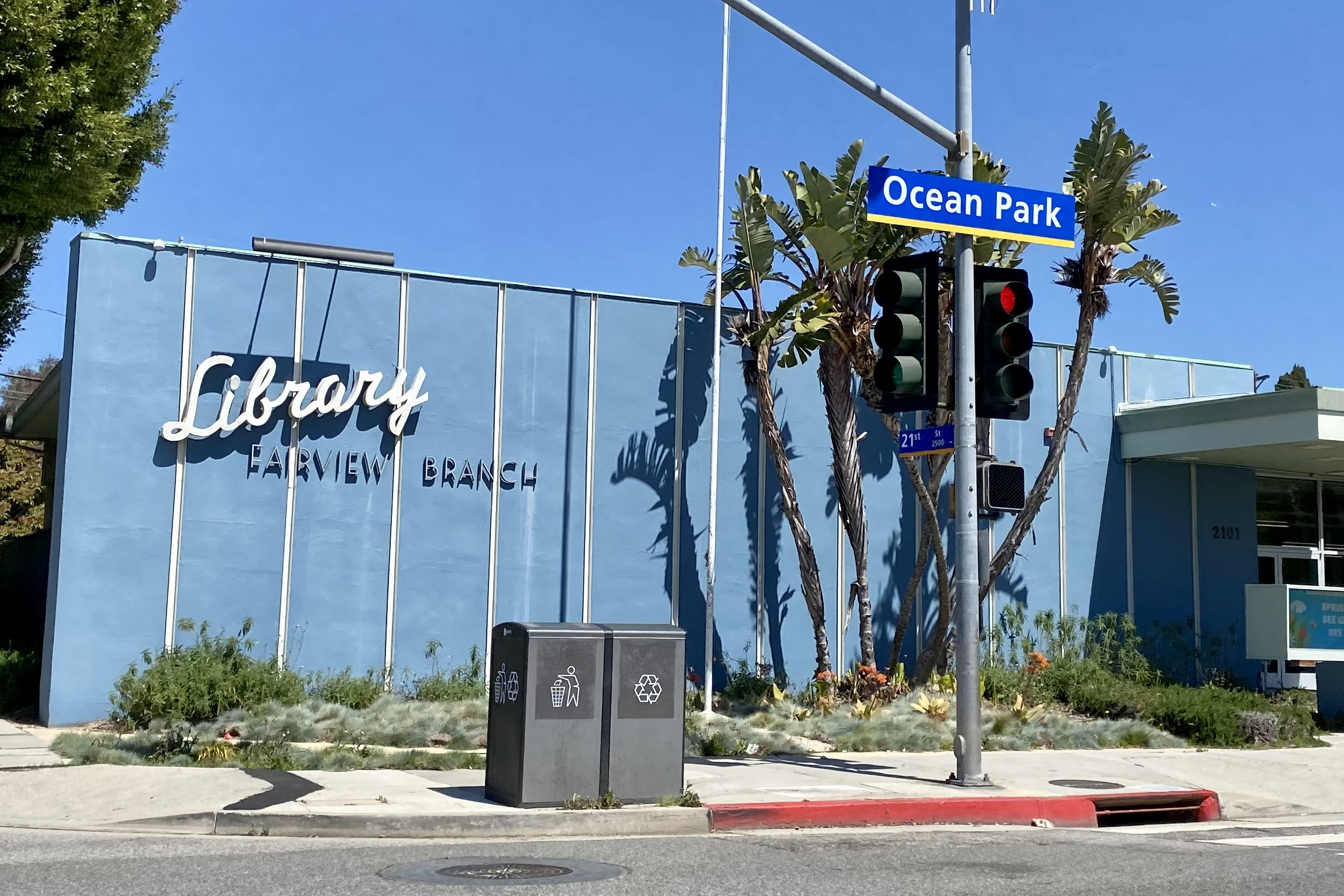
Fairview Branch, Santa Monica Public Library system, California

During World War II, long time Fairview Branch Librarian Nellie Sullivan initiated a service she had read about: preschool story times. It was the first of its kind on the West Coast.

Also, during the war in 1945, the basement of the Ocean Park branch library was converted to a Young People's Room, where teenagers gathered to study and play games. In subsequent years, this room housed children's books, then was used for meetings and library programs.

By the 1950s, plans were underway for a larger building for the Fairview branch, which, since the opening at its second location on Pico Boulevard in 1942, had grown tremendously. In 1956, the third Fairview branch at 2101 Ocean Park Boulevard opened to the public.

To meet the neighborhood library needs of residents on the city's north side, the Montana Avenue Branch, located in a rented building at 1528–30 Montana Avenue, opened in February 1952. The branch thrived, and within six years, the annual circulation climbed to over 80,000 items. The branch soon outgrew its rented space, and plans were made for a new building. The city purchased two lots at 1704 Montana Avenue, and groundbreaking ceremonies were conducted on August 20, 1959. The new Montana Avenue branch library opened to the public on March 1, 1960.

=== A new main Library for the 1960s ===
In 1962, a bond issue was passed and land purchased on the corner of Sixth Street and Santa Monica Boulevard for the building of a new Main library. Construction began in February 1964. This library, designed by architects Matthew Robert Leizer and Thomas J. Russell, opened to the public in September 1965. The street address was 1343 Sixth Street.

Since this new facility did not include a place for the Macdonald-Wright murals (which were painted on detachable plywood panels and were therefore removable), they were first stored in a basement and then accepted by and moved to the Smithsonian Institution. Prior to the opening of the new Main Library building in 2006, the Smithsonian Institution arranged for a long-term loan of the murals to the library. The murals are installed throughout the second floor of the Main Library.

In 1989, the Reference Department began answering questions via electronic mail as part of the city's innovative Public Electronic Network. The Reference Department later began interacting with the public via electronic mail. In 2000, Santa Monica Public Library became the first public library to offer Internet-based chat reference services as the pilot site of the 24/7 Reference Project, now known as OCLC's QuestionPoint service. In 2009, text messaging reference service was added.

In 2000, the Library began lending DVDs. In 2005, the Library began making downloadable audiobooks available online to its cardholders. In spring of 2003, Santa Monica Public Library presented its first Citywide Reads program in which everyone in the city was encouraged to read the same book and to discuss it. The first selection was Dai Sijie's Balzac and the Little Chinese Seamstress.

=== A new main library for the 21st century ===
In 1996, a formal planning process began for the expansion of the Main Library, including community focus groups, surveys, and meetings. The result was a Library Master Plan, and Moore Ruble Yudell (MRY) Architects & Planners of Santa Monica was chosen to formulate the conceptual design. Pamela Burton & Company was the landscape architect on this project. In 1998, a bond was passed by 81% to fund library improvements.

In 2002, after extensive community input, the Santa Monica City Council approved MRY's design.

Prior to the closing of the old Main Library building, the branch libraries were refurbished. The Montana Avenue Branch acquired a community meeting room at this time. Razing of the old library building, construction of the three-level subterranean parking garage, and construction of the two-story Main Library began in spring of 2003.

While the Main Library was under construction, the core of the library's adult collections was housed in a temporary location at 1324 Fifth Street. The "Temp Main" served the public from May 12, 2003, to December 4, 2005. The Main Library's children's and youth collections were located in the lower level of the Ocean Park Branch during this time.

The new Main Library, a 104,000-square-foot facility honored with a Leadership in Energy and Environmental Design (LEED) award, opened to the public in January 2006. The new Main Library featured a larger array of public computer facilities and expanded meeting facilities, including the Martin Luther King Jr. Auditorium.

In 2007, in collaboration with the city's Environmental Programs Division, the Library presented its first Green Prize for Sustainable Literature. The first winner was Al Gore's An Inconvenient Truth. The Library was the host of the United States' first Living Library event in 2008. In 2010, the Library began lending ebooks. Use of the public library system continued to surge throughout the first decade of the new century.

In 2009, visits to the Main Library topped the one million mark for the first time.

=== The first new branch library in over 50 years ===
The Pico Neighborhood Community Plan of 1983 addressed the need for a branch library to return to the neighborhood and suggested combining existing private sector commercial activities with public uses to include a library and a post office. As Virginia Avenue Park was being planned, the inclusion of a library was again raised.

In 2008, the idea of a library returning to the Pico neighborhood gained momentum as the community considered the rebuilding of Edison Language Academy and the opportunity for a joint-use (Santa Monica-Malibu Unified School District and City) branch library was explored. In 2009, the City Council approved construction of a new branch library in Virginia Avenue Park.

Designed by Koning Eizenberg Architecture of Santa Monica, the Pico Branch Library is located in between the Thelma Terry Center and the Farmers Market zone. The single-story, two-building design includes the main 7,872 square-foot library facility and the annex, a separate, 818 square-foot community room, which is connected to the library by a roof-line trellis with solar panels.

The groundbreaking ceremony took place on August 15, 2012. The branch had its soft opening on April 24, 2014, with the ribbon-cutting, grand opening ceremony on Saturday, June 28.
