= Friendship Baptist Church (Pasadena, California) =

Historic church in California, United States

- U.S. National Register of Historic Places
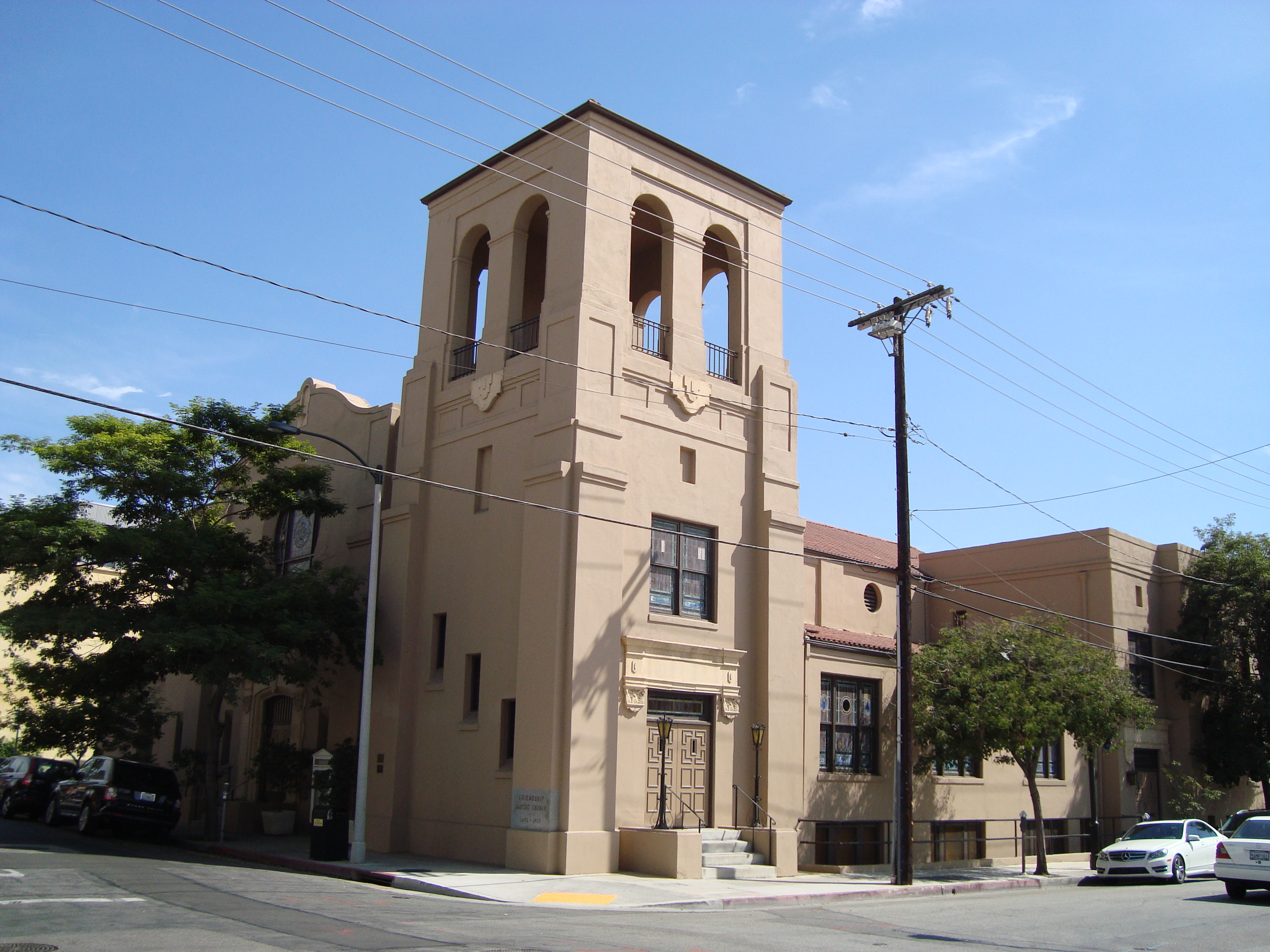

- Location within the Los Angeles metropolitan area Location within California Location within the United States
- Location: 80 W. Dayton St., Pasadena, California
- Coordinates: 34°8′36″N 118°9′4″W
- Area: 0.3 acres (0.12 ha)
- Built: 1925
- Architect: Norman F. Marsh
- Architectural style: Mission/spanish Revival, Spanish Revival
- NRHP reference No.: 78000696
- Added to NRHP: November 20, 1978

Friendship Baptist Church is a Baptist church in Pasadena, California. The oldest black Baptist church in Pasadena, the church was built in 1925 to serve a congregation founded in 1893. The church was designed by Norman F. Marsh in the Spanish Colonial Revival style. Its design includes a tower, a bell-gable, a tile roof, and stained-glass windows. It was listed in the National Register of Historic Places on November 20, 1978.
