= Peter Rodman (scientist) =

Scientist in anthropology and paleontology, studied primates like orangutans

Peter S. Rodman
- Education: B.A., Harvard University, 1963; Ph.D., same, 1973
- Awards: U.C. Davis Academic Senate Distinguished Teaching Award, 2001
- Scientific career
- Fields: Physical anthropology
- Institutions: University of California, Davis

Peter S. Rodman is a professor emeritus at the University of California, Davis in the Department of Anthropology. Rodman began teaching and conducting research at Davis in 1972, and continued until 2006. His specialty while a professor there was in the field of physical anthropology and paleontology, and the study of orangutans and their behavior and ecology in particular, although he has also authored or co-authored works on woolly monkeys, on bipedal locomotion in chimpanzees, and reproduction in bonnet macaques . Among other positions while at UC Davis, Rodman held the chair of the executive committee of the school's College of Letters and Sciences as well as the Chair of the Department of Anthropology. He was closely associated with the California National Primate Research Center, located in Davis, California.

While a professor at UC Davis, Rodman also became known for waging a "one-man battle" to toughen the campus smoke-free policy.

== Publications ==
Rodman has nearly 50 research publications in the field of physical anthropology, and as of 2018 his works have been cited more than 2000 times. The article, "Orangutans: Sexual Dimorphism in a Solitary Species", coauthored by Rodman and John Mitani, is widely considered among primatologists as a definitive publication on sexual dimorphism among orangutans, for whom this characteristic is an extreme one. Rodman spent a total of 3½ years in eastern Borneo between 1969 and 1983 studying this species of ape.
