= Judith Wallerstein =

American psychologist

Judith Saretsky Wallerstein
- Born: Judith Hannah Saretsky; December 27, 1921; New York City, US
- Died: June 18, 2012 (aged 90); Piedmont, California, US
- Awards: Distinguished Teaching Award from the University of California; Koshland Award in Social Welfare; Commendation from the State of California Senate Rules Subcommittee; Rene Spitz Lectureship from the Denver Psychoanalytic society; Election to Who’s Who in American Science; Dale Richmond Award of the American Academy of Pediatrics

Academic background
- Education: Hunter College; Columbia University; Lund University

Academic work
- Main interests: Divorce and the family
- Notable works: Second Chances; The Unexpected Legacy of Divorce; What About the Kids; The Good Marriage: How and Why Love Lasts

Judith Wallerstein (December 27, 1921 – June 18, 2012) was a psychologist who created a 25-year study on the effects of divorce on the children involved. She received a number of prominent awards and honors and wrote four best selling books. Judith Wallerstein was born on December 27, 1921, as Judith Hannah Saretsky in New York City. Her father died from cancer when she was 8 years old. Wallerstein received her bachelor's degree from Hunter College (1943), her Master's in social work from Columbia University (1946) and her Doctorate in psychology from Lund University in Sweden (1978). She died at 90 years old June 18, 2012 from an unexpected intestinal obstruction in Piedmont, California. She was married for 65 years to the academic Robert S. Wallerstein.

== Career ==
Judith Wallerstein taught as the senior lecturer from 1966 to 1991 at the University of California, Berkeley. She held faculty positions at the University of California, The Hebrew University, and Pahlavi University Medical School. In addition, she also lectured at Harvard, Cornell, Stanford, and Yale. Wallerstein was a consultant for the Advisory Commission on Family Law to the California Senate Subcommittee on Administrative Justice, The Commission on Law and Mental Health, State Bar of California, and the California Senate Task Force on Family Equity.

In 1980, she founded the “Judith Wallerstein Center for the Family in Transition” in Madera, California. The center provided counseling and education for divorcing couples and their children. In addition, the center conducted a variety of research pertaining to divorce and the family. Judith Wallerstein's three best-selling books about children and divorce were: Second Chances, The Unexpected Legacy of Divorce, and What About the Kids. In 1995, she published a book titled The Good Marriage: How and Why Love Lasts, which was about making marriage succeed.

Wallerstein received many awards including: the Distinguished Teaching Award from the University of California, The Koshland Award in Social Welfare from the San Francisco Foundation, Commendation from the State of California Senate Rules Subcommittee, the Rene Spitz Lectureship from the Denver Psychoanalytic society, election to Who's Who in American Science, the Dale Richmond Award of the American Academy of Pediatrics, etc.

=== Divorce studies ===
Wallerstein's career was centered around a 25-year-long longitudinal study, the "California Children of Divorce Study," investigating the effects that divorce has on families. She began her study in 1971 with Joan B. Kelly. She followed 131 children between the ages of 3 and 18 from 60 divorced families in Marin County, California, for 25 years, with intensive interviews conducted every 5 years

From her research Wallerstein found that only 40% of children from divorce actually marry. She discovered that the effects of divorce are more long lasting than most assume. The age of child at the time of the divorce really matters, the largest impact occurs during the period where the child of divorce is a young adult wanting a romantic relationship but afraid of failure. Wallerstein also found that the quality of post-divorce life is crucial for the children. In addition, she found that rates of financial support for college decrease after a divorce due to the large expense of the divorce itself.

== Criticisms ==
Although Judith Wallerstein had many allies and a number of best-selling books, she also had critics. Some criticized her for the families she studied that were all middle class and the parents were all well-educated, Wallerstein was criticized for not having a wider variety.

Wallerstein's study exclusively examined middle-class Californians whose participants were pre-selected for therapy and psycho-analysis. She influenced a California court on child relocation, and was criticized by Richard A. Gardner. Feminists felt that Wallerstein was trying to encourage women to stay in bad marriage and discouraging divorce.

== Partial bibliography ==
- Second Chances: Men, Women and Children a Decade After Divorce (with Sandra Blakeslee)(Ticknor & Fields, 1989)
- The Good Marriage: How and Why Love Lasts (Houghton Mifflin, 1995)
- Second Chances: Men, Women and Children a Decade After Divorce (Houghton Mifflin, 1996)
- Surviving The Breakup: How Children And Parents Cope With Divorce (Harper Collins, 1996)
- The Unexpected Legacy of Divorce: A 25-Year Landmark Study (Hyperion, 2000)
