= Industrial Arts Building (Tempe, Arizona) =

- U.S. National Register of Historic Places
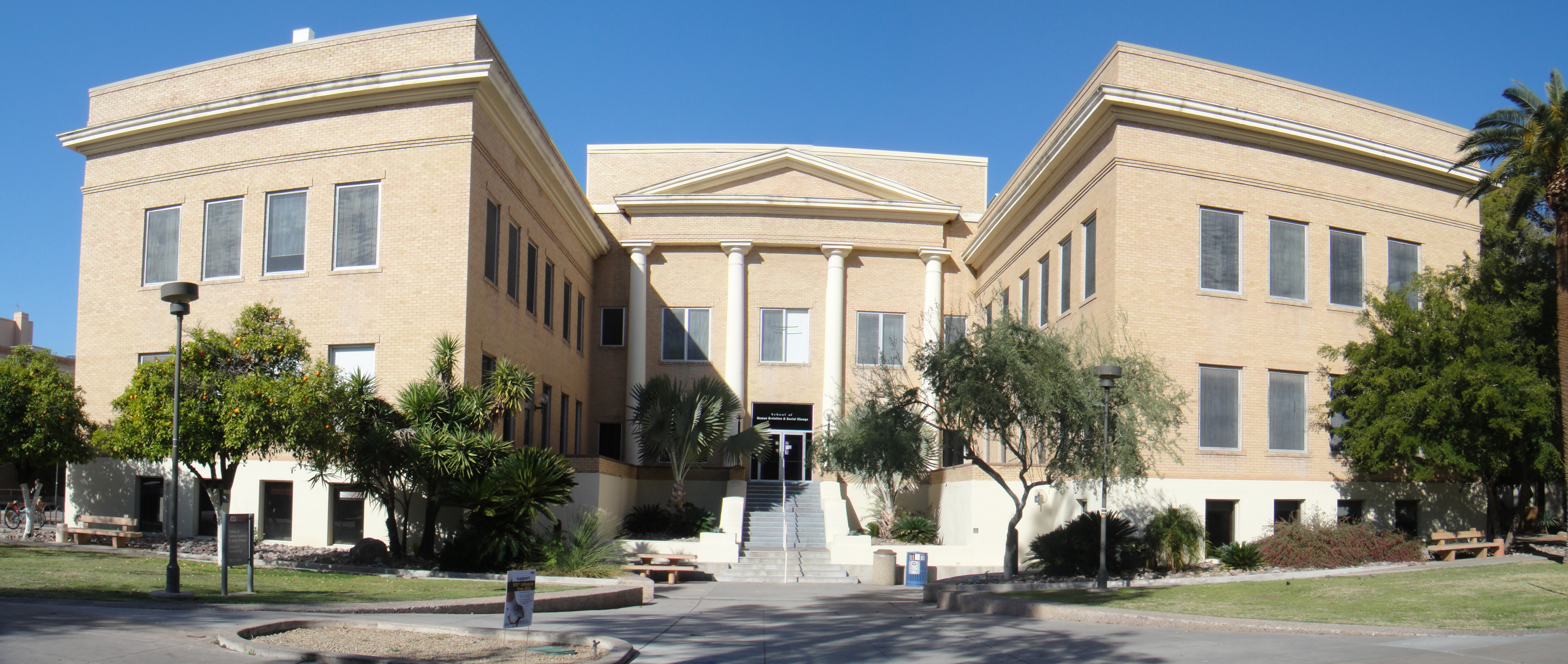
- The east side and main entrance of the Industrial Arts Building

- Location within Arizona Location within the United States
- Location: ASU Campus (Bldg. 4), Tempe, Arizona
- Coordinates: 33°25′14″N 111°56′8″W
- Area: less than one acre
- Built: 1914
- Architect: Knipe, L. G.; Arizona Eng. & Const. Co.
- Architectural style: Classical Revival
- MPS: Tempe MRA
- NRHP reference No.: 85002168
- Added to NRHP: September 4, 1985

The Industrial Arts Building on the Arizona State University campus in Tempe, Arizona, later known as the Anthropology Building and now known as the School of Human Evolution and Social Change, was built in 1914. It was listed on the National Register of Historic Places in 1985.

== History ==
The Industrial Arts Building was designed by L. G. Knipe of Phoenix, following the preliminary drawings of California architect Norman F. Marsh. Marsh's use of Neoclassical Revival architecture had already been demonstrated at such historic sites such as the Monroe School and Phoenix Union High School.

The building is significant in the history of what was then a normal school. It was the first west of College Avenue (which has since been turned into Cady Mall, a pedestrian mall through campus), and it also marked the expansion of the school's scope beyond teacher training.

== Architecture ==
The Industrial Arts Building is shaped like the letter H, with two stories and a basement. The central entry is recessed 55 feet from the north and south wings, featuring a Neoclassical Revival pediment supported by four Doric columns. The building is faced with tan bricks.

Interior renovations in 1936 and 1973 have removed most of the original interior finishes.
