= Hillel J. Einhorn =

American psychologist (1941–1987)

- Born: Hillel J. Einhorn; 12 June 1941
- Died: 12 January 1987 (aged 45)
- Education: Brooklyn College (BA, MA), Wayne State University ( PhD)
- Known for: Judgment & Decision-Making
- Scientific career
- Fields: Decision Theory Decision-Making
- Workplaces: University of Chicago

Hillel J. Einhorn (June 12, 1941 – January 8, 1987) was an American psychologist who played a key role in the development of the field of behavioral decision theory. Einhorn earned BA and MA degrees at Brooklyn College, married Susan Michaels in 1966, and received his PhD in psychology from Wayne State University in 1969 under the supervision of Alan Bass. In 1969, Einhorn joined the faculty of the Graduate School of Business (now the Booth School of Business) at the University of Chicago. He was promoted to professor in 1976 and appointed to the Wallace W. Booth professorship in 1986. In addition to his research contributions, Einhorn restructured the behavioral science curriculum by providing a specific focus on behavioral decision theory, and founded the Center for Decision Research at the University of Chicago in 1977. Einhorn died of Hodgkin's disease on January 8, 1987, at the age of 45.

== Research ==
Einhorn studied many different aspects of decision making, including clinical judgment, effects of imperfect feedback, group judgments, causal reasoning, belief updating, and risky choice. He further contributed to the debate on the meaning of rationality, taking a position that favored appreciating the advantages of different views. His work on decision making also had a practical perspective. He favored simple methods that people could use effectively. The Society for Judgment and Decision Making's Hillel J. Einhorn New Investigator Award is named for him.

== Selected publications ==
- Einhorn, HJ; Hogarth, RM (1981). "Behavioral Decision Theory: Processes of Judgement and Choice". Annual Review of Psychology. 32 (1): 53–88. doi:10.1146/annurev.ps.32.020181.000413. ISSN 0066-4308.
- Hogarth, RM; Einhorn, HJ (1992). "Order effects in belief updating: The belief-adjustment model". Cognitive Psychology. 24 (1): 1–55. doi:10.1016/0010-0285(92)90002-J. ISSN 0010-0285. S2CID 54272129.
- Einhorn, HJ; Hogarth, RM (1978). "Confidence in judgment: Persistence of the illusion of validity". Psychological Review. 85 (5): 395–416. doi:10.1037/0033-295X.85.5.395. ISSN 0033-295X.
- Einhorn, HJ; Hogarth, RM (1986). "Judging probable cause". Psychological Bulletin. 99 (1): 3–19. doi:10.1037/0033-2909.99.1.3. ISSN 1939-1455.
- Einhorn, HJ; Hogarth, RM (1985). "Ambiguity and uncertainty in probabilistic inference". Psychological Review. 92 (4): 433–461. doi:10.1037/0033-295X.92.4.433. ISSN 1939-1471.
