= Urs Fischbacher =

Swiss economist

Urs Fischbacher (born 17 September 1959 in Dietikon, Zürich) is a Swiss economist and professor of applied economic research at the University of Konstanz. He is director of the Thurgau Economic Institute, an affiliated institute of the University of Konstanz. He pioneered the field of software tools for experimental economics.

== Biography ==
A native of Dietikon (Switzerland), Urs Fischbacher studied mathematics at the University of Zurich from 1978 to 1985, earning a doctoral degree under Prof. Dr. Pierre Gabriel with a thesis on the combinatorics of algebras with finite ideals. Thereafter, Fischbacher worked as a software developer in the private sector for Mettler Instrumente (1985–87) and Mecasoft AG (1987-81) before becoming a researcher at the Swiss Federal Institute WSL. In 1995, Fischbacher began working at the Institute for Empirical Research in Economics on the development of z-Tree, a programming language for the implementation of scientific laboratory experiments that is being used worldwide in numerous research institutions., where he also began to perform research in experimental economics. This research resulted in his habilitation in economics in 2006 on the topics of human motivation and cooperation. Since 2007, Fischbacher has been a full professor at the University of Konstanz and the head of the Thurgau Institute of Economics. Additionally, he has also held visiting appointments at Harvard Business School, the University of Copenhagen, the University of Nottingham, and the University of Maastricht. In terms of professional service, Fischbacher performs editorial duties at the European Journal of Political Economy, the Journal of Behavioral and Experimental Economics, and Experimental Economics, among others.

== Research ==
Urs Fischbacher's research areas include experimental economics, behavioral economics and neuroeconomics. According to IDEAS/RePEc, he belongs to the 1% of most highly cited economists. Key findings of his research include:

- Although a majority of subjects in the public goods game display conditional cooperation, about a third of subjects freeride completely, thus explaining why cooperation in public goods games tends to break down over time (with Simon Gächter and Ernst Fehr).
- The stylized facts observed in ultimatum, dictator, and public goods games as well as in the prisoner's dilemma can be explained by a theory of reciprocity wherein people reward kind actions and punish unkind ones depending on the actions' intentions (with Armin Falk).
- In ultimatum games, rejection rates for identical offers depend on what other offers are available to the proposer, implying that the utility of an action is affected by the alternatives to that action (with Falk and Fehr).
- The inclusion of social preferences, i.e. preferences that also care about the payoffs given to certain other agents, is necessary to understand the effects of competition and material incentives, cooperation and collective action, the optimality of contracts and property rights arrangements, and how social norms and market failures emerge (with Fehr).
- Voluntary cooperation in public goods games is fragile because many people want to contribute less than others, rather than because of changing beliefs regarding others' contributions or differences between people's preferences, and often eventually devolves into universal freeriding.
- Both agents' positive and negative reciprocal behaviour is affected by their beliefs about other agents' intentions to behave fairly (with Falk and Fehr).
- In experiments on cheating, 39% of participants were completely honest, while at most 22% lied completely. In some cases, people lied to their disadvantage, which is shown to be motivated by the desire to maintain a positive self-concept, e.g. regarding honesty and a lack of greediness (with Franziska Föllmi-Heusi).
- Theories of fairness postulating that players aim to minimize payoff inequalities in cooperation games cannot explain why cooperators keep punishing defectors even in situations where payoff inequalities cannot be reduced, thus suggesting a role for retaliation as a driving force behind informal sanctions (with Falk and Fehr).

== Awards and reception ==
Fischbacher is listed by Thomson Reuters in the "Highly Cited Researchers 2014" list as one of the world's most cited scientists. In the FAZ economists 2014 Rankings, he finished second. In December 2016, Fischbacher was awarded the Joachim Herz Research prize for "Best research work". The prize acknowledged his research on reciprocity in social exchange and the development of the z-Tree laboratory software.

== Selected publications ==
=== Journal articles ===
- Urs Fischbacher; Ernst Fehr (2003). "The nature of human altruism" (PDF). Nature. 425 (6960): 785–791. Bibcode:2003Natur.425..785F. doi:10.1038/nature02043. PMID 14574401. S2CID 4305295.
- Urs Fischbacher (2007). "z-Tree: Zurich toolbox for ready-made economic experiments". Experimental Economics. 10 (2): 171–178. doi:10.1007/s10683-006-9159-4.
