= Ernst Fehr =

Austrian-Swiss economist (born 1956)

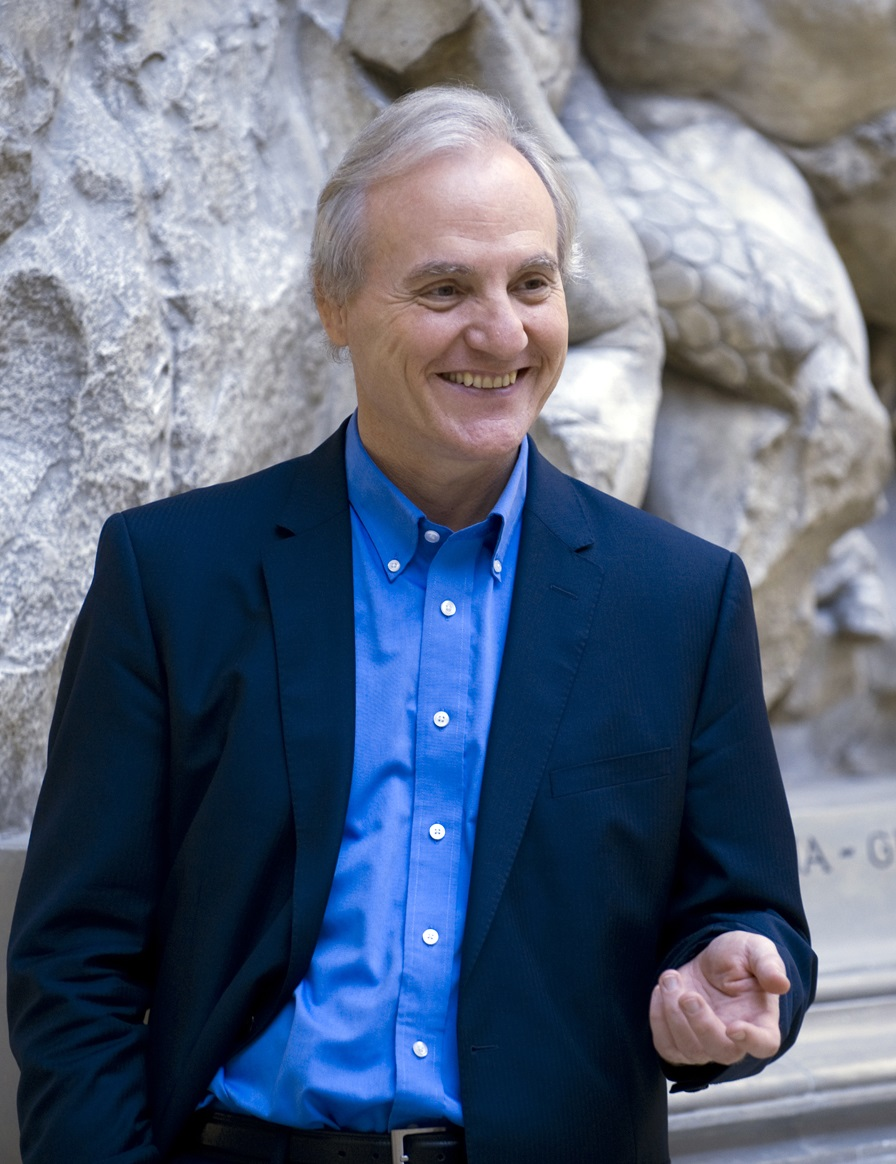
- Fehr in 2010
- Born: 21 June 1956 (age 70); Hard, Austria

Academic background
- Education: University of Vienna

Academic work
- Discipline: Behavioral economics
- Institutions: University of Zürich
- Doctoral students: Armin Falk, Johannes Haushofer
- Awards: Gossen Prize (1999), Marcel Benoist Prize (2008)
- Website: Information at IDEAS / RePEc

Ernst Fehr (born 21 June 1956 in Hard, Vorarlberg, Austria) is an Austrian-Swiss behavioral economist and neuroeconomist. He is a Professor of Microeconomics and Experimental Economic Research at the University of Zurich (UZH), teaching there since 1994, and Director of the UBS Center for Economics in Society since 2012. He previously served as Chairman of the Department of Economics at the University of Zurich from 2010 to 2015, was an Affiliated Faculty Member of the Department of Economics at MIT from 2003 to 2011, and a Global Distinguished Professor in Economics at New York University from 2011 to 2020. His research covers the areas of the evolution of human cooperation and sociality, in particular fairness, reciprocity and bounded rationality.

He is also well known for his important contributions to the new field of neuroeconomics, as well as to behavioral economics, behavioral finance and experimental economics. According to IDEAS/REPEC, he is the second-most influential German-speaking economist, and is ranked at 75th globally.

In 2010, he co-founded FehrAdvice & Partners with his brother Gerhard Fehr, creating the first globally operating consultancy firm completely dedicated to behavioral economics.

In 2016, Fehr was ranked as the most influential economist in Germany, Austria, and Switzerland.

== Awards and honours ==
In 2008, Fehr won the Marcel-Benoist science prize of 100,000 Swiss francs. In 2011, he received the Science Prize of the State of Vorarlberg, which carries €10,000. In 2012, he received the Austrian Decoration for Science and Art and on 9 April 2013 he was awarded the Gottlieb Duttweiler Prize "for his pioneering research on the role of fairness in markets, organisations and in individual decisions".

Fehr was elected an International Honorary Member of the American Academy of Arts and Sciences in 2007. He is a member of the American Academy of Political and Social Science and visiting professor at the Massachusetts Institute of Technology.

Fehr holds honorary doctorates from several universities, including the Università della Svizzera italiana (2009), the University of Graz (2016) and the University of Copenhagen (2022).

In 2017, Fehr was appointed as lifelong foreign honorary member of the American Economic Association, AEA, together with Philippe Aghion, an economics professor at Harvard University. The number of honorary members is limited. The election is made by the Executive Committee of the American Economic Association and will only take place if a former honorary member dies.

In 2026, he was elected an international member of the United States National Academy of Sciences. The same year, he was also elected a foreign member of the Order Pour le Mérite for Sciences and Arts.

== Why Social Preferences Matter ==
In his 2002 collaboration with Urs Fischbacher, Why Social Preferences Matter – The Impact of Non-Selfish Motives on Competition, Cooperation and Incentives, he begins with the abstract:

A substantial number of people exhibit social preferences, which means they are not solely motivated by material self-interest but also care positively or negatively for the material payoffs of relevant reference agents. We show empirically that economists can fail to understand fundamental economic questions when they disregard social preferences, in particular, that without taking social preferences into account, it is not possible to understand adequately (i) effects of competition on market outcomes, (ii) laws governing cooperation and collective action, (iii) effects and the determinants of material incentives, (iv) which contracts and property rights arrangements are optimal, and (v) important forces shaping social norms and market failures.

He conjectures that we could call economics "the dismal science" because it consistently assumes the worst in human motives, which contrasts sharply with the pervasive idea that consumer tastes are heterogeneous. He attacks the idea on two fronts. First, because a great amount of evidence has contradicted the selfishness hypothesis; second, because failure to regard other-concerning behavior ignores central market activities.

== See also ==
- Dictator game
- Inequity aversion
- List of publications in economics

== Selected publications ==
=== Books ===
- Fehr, Ernst; Henrich, Joseph; Boyd, Robert; Camerer, Colin; Bowles, Samuel; Gintis, Herbert (2004). Foundations of human sociality: economic experiments and ethnographic evidence from fifteen small-scale societies. Oxford New York: Oxford University Press. ISBN 9780199262052.
- Fehr, Ernst; Gintis, Herbert; Bowles, Samuel; Boyd, Robert (2005). Moral sentiments and material interests: the foundations of cooperation in economic life. Cambridge, Massachusetts: MIT Press. ISBN 9780262572378.

=== Selected articles ===
- Fehr, Ernst; Schmidt, Klaus M. (1999). "A Theory of Fairness, Competition, and Cooperation". The Quarterly Journal of Economics. 114 (3): 817–868. doi:10.1162/003355399556151.
- Fehr, Ernst; Gächter, Simon (2000). "Cooperation and Punishment in Public Goods Experiments". American Economic Review. 90 (4): 980–994. doi:10.1257/aer.90.4.980.
- Fehr, Ernst; Gächter, Simon (2002). "Altruistic punishment in humans". Nature. 415 (6868): 137–140. doi:10.1038/415137a. PMID 11805837.
- Fehr, Ernst; Fischbacher, Urs (2003). "The nature of human altruism". Nature. 425 (6960): 785–791. doi:10.1038/nature02043. PMID 14574401.
- Kosfeld, Michael; Heinrichs, Markus; Zak, Paul J.; Fischbacher, Urs; Fehr, Ernst (2005). "Oxytocin increases trust in humans". Nature. 435 (7042): 673–676. doi:10.1038/nature03701. PMID 15931222.
- Haushofer, Johannes; Fehr, Ernst (2014). "On the psychology of poverty". Science. 344 (6186): 862–867. doi:10.1126/science.1232491. PMID 24855262.
