= Impunity game =

Game in experimental economics

The impunity game is a simple game in experimental economics, similar to the Dictator Game.

The first player "the proposer" chooses between two possible divisions of some endowment (such as a cash prize):

1. The first choice will be a very unequal division, giving most of the endowment to themself, and sharing little with the second player (the partner or the "responder").
2. The second choice is a more even division, giving a "fair" proportion of the initial pie to the responder, and keeping the rest for themself.

The second and final move of the game is in the hands of the responder: he can accept or reject the amount offered. Unlike the ultimatum game, this has no effect on the proposer, who always keeps the share she originally awarded themself.

This game has been studied less intensively than the other standards of experimental economics, but appears to produce the interesting result that proposers typically take the "least fair" option, keeping most of the reward for themselves, a conclusion sharply in contrast to that implied by the ultimatum or dictator games. (Note: See Bolton, Katok & Zwick (1998) for a dictator game comparison.)
