= Armin Falk =

German economist (born 1968)

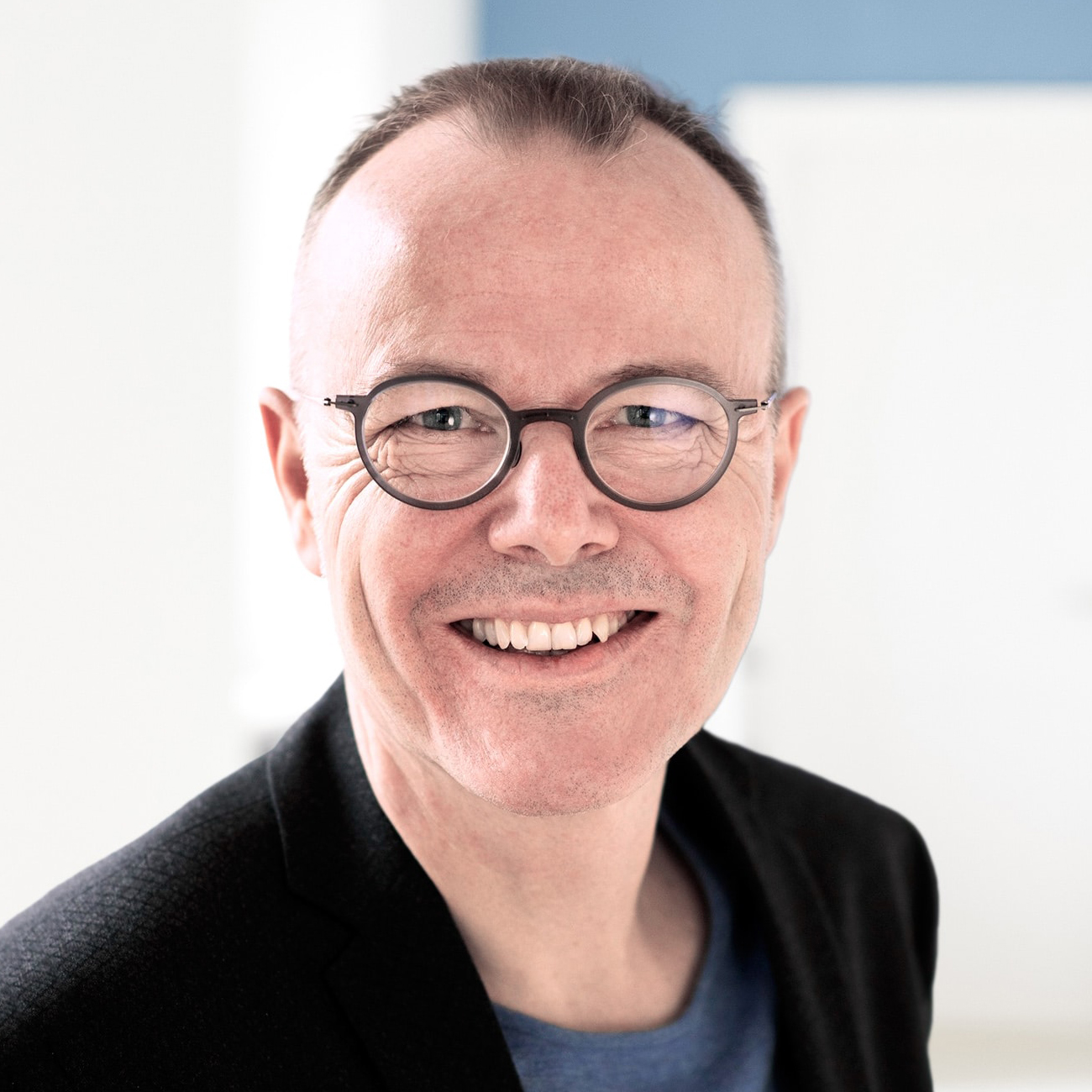
- Armin Falk (2019)
- Born: 18 January 1968 (age 58); Bergisch Gladbach

Academic background
- Education: University of Zurich; University of Cologne
- Doctoral advisor: Ernst Fehr

Academic work
- Discipline: Microeconomics; Behavioral economics Experimental economics
- Institutions: University of Bonn
- Awards: Yrjö Jahnsson Award (2011); Leibniz Prize (2009); Gossen Award (2008)
- Website: econ.uni-bonn.de/iame/falk; Information at IDEAS / RePEc

Armin Falk (born 18 January 1968 in Bergisch Gladbach) is a German economist and Professor of Economics at the Institute for Applied Microeconomics at the University of Bonn.

== Education and career ==
Falk studied philosophy and history as well as economics at the University of Cologne. He received a doctoral degree in economics from the University of Zurich in 1999. He has been Professor of Economics at the University of Bonn since 2003 and Director of the BonnEconLab, the university's laboratory for experimental economics, since 2004.

From 2003 to 2007, Falk served as Research Director at the Institute for the Study of Labor (IZA). In 2009, he cofounded the Center for Economics and Neuroscience (CENs) at the University of Bonn, where he served as Director until 2016. In 2016, Falk became the CEO of the newly established Institute on Behavior and Inequality (briq) in Bonn, a sister institution of IZA. He served as the CEO of briq until the end of 2023.

== Research ==
Falk's research is primarily in behavioral and experimental economics. It combines laboratory and field experiments with large-scale survey data to study economic preferences and decision-making. A particular focus lies on cooperation and social behavior in general, including its development in childhood and its malleability in response to the environment.

=== Economic preferences and their measurement ===
A central strand of Falk's work examines how risk, time, and social preferences can be measured, with the objective of investigating how these preferences vary across individuals and countries, and how they relate to economic and social outcomes. This includes work on the Global Preferences Survey and the associated Preference Survey Module.

=== Cooperation, social, and moral decision-making ===
Falk has extensively studied cooperation, altruism, social norms, and moral decision-making. A 2013 study and a 2020 study coauthored by Falk examined how the willingness to avoid harm to third parties is influenced by market settings. The authors observed that market forces can erode moral behavior. In a 2024 study, Falk and coauthors investigated how altruistic decisions depend on the trade-off between earlier and later benefits. For a study published in 2026, Falk and his coauthors conducted a cooperation experiment in 125 countries. They observed that in 124 of these 125 countries, people, on average, underestimated others' willingness to cooperate and that this perception gap negatively affects people's willingness to cooperate.

=== Climate-change behavior ===
Other recent research by Falk and coauthors considers how beliefs about public support for climate action shape one's own willingness to act on climate change. This work uses survey evidence collected around the globe—the Global Climate Change Survey—to distinguish actual from perceived support for climate action. A 2024 study by Peter Andre, Teodora Boneva, Felix Chopra, and Falk found broad support for stepping up climate action across 125 countries, accompanied by a widespread underestimation of the extent of that support, a manifestation of pluralistic ignorance. The authors find most participants to be conditionally cooperative, with the consequence that "correcting these misperceptions" by providing information on others' true willingness to fight climate change "causally raises individual willingness to act against climate change and individual support for climate policies", as they report in another recent publication.

=== Education, child development, and inequality ===
Another strand of Falk's research investigates the formation of preferences as well as cognitive and noncognitive skills in children. In collaboration with other researchers from the University of Bonn, Falk developed the Bonn Intervention Panel, a longitudinal study that follows children from primary-school age to adulthood and includes a randomized mentoring intervention. Using this dataset, Falk and colleagues have examined how children's outcomes are shaped by their families' socioeconomic status (SES) and by the change in the social environment brought about by the mentoring intervention. Falk and colleagues documented "that children from high-SES families are more intelligent, patient, and altruistic as well as less risk seeking" than children from low-SES families. The researchers also found that the mentoring intervention increased children's prosociality, with the effect being strongest for low-SES children, and that the intervention improved the schooling decisions of low-SES children.

=== Behavioral labor economics ===
Falk's work on labor markets and organizations studies, for instance, how autonomy, perceived fairness, and social comparisons influence effort, motivation, employment relationships, and wage determination.

== Published works (selection) ==
=== Peer-reviewed journal articles (in reverse chronological order) ===
- Andre, Peter; Boneva, Teodora; Chopra, Felix; Falk, Armin (2026). "Misperceived Social Norms and Willingness to Act Against Climate Change". Review of Economics and Statistics. doi:10.1162/rest_a_01468. hdl:10419/284397.
- Andre, Peter; Boneva, Teodora; Chopra, Felix; Falk, Armin (2026). "Homo cooperans: Understanding the nature of human cooperation". Science. 392 (6802). doi:10.1126/science.aec9483.
- Falk, Armin; Kosse, Fabian; Pinger, Pia (2026). "Mentoring and Schooling Decisions: Causal Evidence". Journal of Political Economy. 134 (1): 366–396. doi:10.1086/738484.
- Andre, Peter; Boneva, Teodora; Chopra, Felix; Falk, Armin (2024). "Globally Representative Evidence on the Actual and Perceived Support for Climate Action". Nature Climate Change. 14: 253–259. doi:10.1038/s41558-024-01925-3.
- Chopra, Felix; Falk, Armin; Graeber, Thomas (2024). "Intertemporal Altruism". American Economic Journal: Microeconomics. 16 (1): 329–357. doi:10.1257/mic.20210319.
- Falk, Armin; Becker, Anke; Dohmen, Thomas; Huffman, David; Sunde, Uwe (2023). "The Preference Survey Module: A Validated Instrument for Measuring Risk, Time, and Social Preferences". Management Science. 69 (4): 1935–1950. doi:10.1287/mnsc.2022.4455.
- Falk, Armin; Kosse, Fabian; Pinger, Pia; Schildberg-Hörisch, Hannah; Deckers, Thomas (2021). "Socioeconomic Status and Inequalities in Children's IQ and Economic Preferences". Journal of Political Economy. 129 (9): 2504–2545. doi:10.1086/714992.
- Falk, Armin; Neuber, Thomas; Szech, Nora (2020). "Diffusion of Being Pivotal and Immoral Outcomes". Review of Economic Studies. 87 (5): 2205–2229. doi:10.1093/restud/rdz064.
- Kosse, Fabian; Deckers, Thomas; Pinger, Pia; Schildberg-Hörisch, Hannah; Falk, Armin (2020). "The Formation of Prosociality: Causal Evidence on the Role of Social Environment". Journal of Political Economy. 128 (2): 434–467. doi:10.1086/704386.
- Falk, Armin; Becker, Anke; Dohmen, Thomas; Enke, Benjamin; Huffman, David; Sunde, Uwe (2018). "Global Evidence on Economic Preferences". Quarterly Journal of Economics. 133 (4): 1645–1692. doi:10.1093/qje/qjy013.
- Falk, Armin; Szech, Nora (2013). "Morals and Markets". Science. 340 (6133): 707–711. doi:10.1126/science.1231566.
- Dohmen, Thomas; Falk, Armin; Huffman, David; Sunde, Uwe (2012). "The Intergenerational Transmission of Risk and Trust Attitudes". Review of Economic Studies. 79 (2): 645–677. doi:10.1093/restud/rdr027.
- Falk, Armin; Fehr, Ernst; Fischbacher, Urs (2008). "Testing theories of fairness—Intentions matter". Games and Economic Behavior. 62 (1): 287–303. doi:10.1016/j.geb.2007.06.001. hdl:20.500.11850/146605.
- Fliessbach, Klaus; Weber, Bernd; Trautner, Peter; Dohmen, Thomas; Sunde, Uwe; Elger, Christian E.; Falk, Armin (2007). "Social Comparison Affects Reward-Related Brain Activity in the Human Ventral Striatum". Science. 318 (5854): 1305–1308. doi:10.1126/science.1145876.
- Falk, Armin (2007). "Gift Exchange in the Field". Econometrica. 75 (5): 1501–1511. doi:10.1111/j.1468-0262.2007.00800.x.
- Falk, Armin; Kosfeld, Michael (2006). "The Hidden Costs of Control". American Economic Review. 96 (5): 1611–1630. doi:10.1257/aer.96.5.1611.
- Falk, Armin; Fehr, Ernst; Zehnder, Christian (2006). "Fairness Perceptions and Reservation Wages—the Behavioral Effects of Minimum Wage Laws". Quarterly Journal of Economics. 121 (4): 1347–1381. doi:10.1093/qje/121.4.1347.
- Falk, Armin; Fischbacher, Urs (2006). "A Theory of Reciprocity". Games and Economic Behavior. 54 (2): 293–315. doi:10.1016/j.geb.2005.03.001.
- Fehr, Ernst; Falk, Armin (1999). "Wage Rigidity in a Competitive Incomplete Contract Market". Journal of Political Economy. 107 (1): 106–134. doi:10.1086/250052.

=== Data sets and survey instruments ===
- "Global Cooperation Dataset". bonndata, University of Bonn. 2026.
- "Global Climate Change Survey". University of Bonn. 2024.
- "Global Preferences Survey". University of Bonn. 2018.

=== Book ===
- Falk, Armin (2022). Warum es so schwer ist, ein guter Mensch zu sein … und wie wir das ändern können: Antworten eines Verhaltensökonomen (in German). Siedler. ISBN 978-3-8275-0160-8.

== Media and public reception ==
Falk's research on public support for climate action has informed public-facing climate-communication initiatives. The 89 Percent Project, a global journalism project by Covering Climate Now, lists the 2024 study by Andre et al. and the associated Global Climate Change Survey among its resources.

The same study also inspired We Are The Majority, a video campaign by Climate Acceptance Studios.

== Recognition ==
- 2021–present: Fellow of the Econometric Society
- 2015–2019: European Research Council (ERC) Advanced Grant for Institutions and Morality
- 2011: Yrjö Jahnsson Award of the European Economic Association
- 2009–present: Member of the German National Academy of Sciences Leopoldina
- 2009–present: Member of the North Rhine-Westphalian Academy of Sciences, Humanities and the Arts
- 2009: Gottfried Wilhelm Leibniz Prize of the German Research Foundation
- 2009–2013: European Research Council (ERC) Starting Grant for Understanding Preferences: Measurement, Prevalence, Determinants and Consequences
- 2008: Hermann Heinrich Gossen Award of the Verein für Socialpolitik
- 2007–present: Fellow of the European Economic Association

== Miscellaneous ==
In fall 2022, unsubstantiated claims about Falk, interpreted as allegations of "misconduct", were made on social media and circulated among economists. Two independent reviews, one conducted by a law firm with relevant expertise commissioned by briq and the other conducted by the University of Bonn, found the claims to be entirely unfounded. briq considered Falk "fully rehabilitated"; likewise, the university considered him "fully exonerated from the allegations". The statements made on social media nevertheless prompted opposition, and sparked coverage by news outlets, after a merger between briq and IZA was announced in fall 2023 and Falk was designated to lead the combined institution. Falk subsequently withdrew his willingness to assume the leadership position.
