= Social preferences =

Human tendency to care about social outcomes

Social preferences, also known as distributional preferences, describe the human tendency to not only care about one's own material payoff, but also the reference group's payoff or/and the intention that leads to the payoff. Social preferences are studied extensively in behavioral and experimental economics and social psychology. Types of social preferences include altruism, fairness, reciprocity, and inequity aversion. The field of economics originally assumed that humans were rational economic actors, and as it became apparent that this was not the case, the field began to change. The research of social preferences in economics started with lab experiments in 1980, where experimental economists found subjects' behavior deviated systematically from self-interest behavior in economic games such as ultimatum game and dictator game. These experimental findings then inspired various new economic models to characterize agent's altruism, fairness and reciprocity concern between 1990 and 2010. More recently, there are growing amounts of field experiments that study the shaping of social preference and its applications throughout society.

== Determinants: nature vs. nurture ==
Social preferences are thought to come about by two different methods: nature and nurture. Whilst nature encompasses biological makeup and genetics, nurture refers to the social environment in which one develops. The majority of literature would support that "nature" influences social preferences more strongly whereas there is still research to support the heavy influence of sociocultural factors. Some of these factors include social distance between economic agents, the distribution of economic resources, social norms, religion and ethnicity.

== Importance ==
An understanding of social preferences and the disparity that occurs across individuals and groups can help create models that better represent reality. Within the financial sector, research supports the existence of a positive relationship between the elements of trust and reciprocity to economic growth as observed in a reduction of defaults in lending programs as well as the effectiveness of government and central banking policy. The well-functioning of social preferences may assist society in paving the way to new developments through a decrease in the likelihood of market failures as well as a reduction in transaction costs. Society may also utilize social preferences to increase the flow of information, transparency and accountability.

== Formation ==
Biologists, social psychologists, and economists have proposed theories and documented evidence on the formation of social preferences over both the long run and the short run. The various theories explaining the formation and development of social preferences may be explained from a biological, cognitive and sociocultural perspective and are detailed as follows.

=== Biological evolution ===
==== Kin selection ====
Kin selection is an evolutionary strategy where some specific behavioral traits are favored to benefit close relatives' reproduction. Hence, behavior that appears altruistic can align with the theory of the selfish gene. Kin selection can explain altruistic behavior towards close relatives even at the cost of their own's survival, as long as one's sacrifice can help preserve a greater amount of the same genes in close relatives. For example, worker bees can die from attacking their predators in order to help preserve other bees' genes.

==== Reciprocity selection ====
Reciprocity selection suggests that one's altruistic act may evolve from the anticipation of future reciprocal altruistic behavior from others. An application of reciprocity selection in game theory is the Tit-For-Tat strategy in prisoner's dilemma, which is the strategy that the player cooperates at the initial encounter, and then follow the opponent's behavior on the previous encounter. Robert Axelrod and W. D. Hamilton showed that Tit-For-Tat strategy can be an evolutionary stable strategy in a population where the probability of repeated encounters between two persons in a population is above a certain threshold.

=== Social learning ===
Psychologist Albert Bandura proposed that children learn about pro-social and moral behavior by imitating other pro-social models, including parents, other adults, and peers. There are also economic models proposing that parents transmit their social preferences to their children by demonstrating their own pro-social behavior. Bandura conducted extensive psychological experimentation into the extent to which children will emulate aggressive behaviour by exposing them to models displaying behaviour before observing the child's behaviour once left alone.

However, empirical support for parents' role in fostering pro-social behavior is mixed. For example, some researchers found a positive relation between the parent's use of induction and children's pro-social behavior, and others found no correlation between parent's adoption of punitive techniques and children's pro-social behavior.

Regarding other sources of social learning, recent field experiments have provided causal evidences for positive effects of school program and mentoring program on forming social preferences, and these research suggested that social interaction, prosocial role models as well as cultural transmission from family and school are potential mechanisms.

=== Cognitive factors ===
Psychologist Jean Piaget was among the first to propose that cognitive development is a prerequisite in moral judgment and behavior. He argued for the importance of social interaction with others rather than learning in moral development, which requires the understanding of both rules and others' behavior. Other important cognitive skills in fostering pro-social behavior include perspective taking and moral reasoning, which are supported by most empirical evidence.

== Evidences of social preferences ==
=== Experimental evidences ===
Many initial evidences of social preferences came from lab experiments where subjects play economic games with others. However, many research found that subjects' behavior robustly and systematically deviated from the prediction from self-interest hypothesis, but could be explained by social preferences including altruism, inequity aversion and reciprocity. The ultimatum game, the dictator game, the trust game and the gift-exchange game are exercises that used to understand social preferences and their implications.

=== The Ultimatum Game ===
Ultimatum game is one of the first experiments that shows self-interest hypothesis fails to predict people's behavior. In this game, the first mover proposes a split of a fixed amount, and the second mover decides to accept or reject the offer. If the second mover accepts the offer, the final payoff is exactly determined by the offer. However, if the second mover rejects the offer, both subjects will have zero payoff. Contrary to the self-interest hypothesis's prediction that the first mover will propose zero amount and the second mover will accept the offer, experimenters found proposers will typically offer 25%-50% of the fixed amount, and responders tend to reject the offer when the split is below 20%.

=== The Dictator Game ===
A relevant game is dictator game, where one subject proposes the split of a fixed amount and the other subject is only allowed to accept the offer. The dictator game helps to isolate pure altruism from the strategic concern of the first mover (i.e. the first mover proposes a larger share to second mover to avoid second mover's rejection) in the ultimatum game. In this game, the average share decreases to 20% of the fixed amount, however, more than 60% of the subjects still propose a positive offer.

=== The Trust and Gift-Exchange Games ===
Two other games, trust game (also called investment game) and gift-exchange game provide evidence for reciprocal behavior. In the trust game, the first mover is endowed with a fixed amount c, and decides the amount of money b to pass on to the second mover. This amount is multiplied by a factor of k when it reaches the second mover, and then the second mover decides how much of this amount (kb) is returned to the first mover. While self-interest model predicts no transfer and no return, experimenters found that first mover typically transfers roughly 50% of endowment and responder's return increases with the transfer. In gift exchange game, the first mover proposes some offer to the second mover and asks for certain effort level from the second mover, and then the second mover decides his/her effort that is costly but can increase first mover's payoff. Also contrary to the self-interest prediction, first mover's offer in experiments is usually greater than zero, and the second mover's effort level increases with offer.

Prisoner's dilemma and its generalized game, public goods game also provide indirect evidence for social preference, and there are many evidences of conditional cooperation among subjects. The prisoner's dilemma game illustrates the fact that the process of cooperation itself can create incentives to not cooperate. Each player may make a contribution to a notional public good before all contributions are summed and distributed to players where the "selfish" players are given the opportunity to "free ride". This game depicts the way in which consumers will tend to free ride without active intervention yet also the way consumers will change their behaviour with experience.

=== Field evidences ===
Many field evidences documented agent's fairness and reciprocal concern. For example, Daniel Kahneman, Jack Knetsch and Richard Thaler found that the concern for fairness constrains firm's profit seeking behavior (e.g. raise price after an increase in demand).

Many field experiments examine relative pay concerns and reciprocity in work settings. For example, economists Uri Gneezy and John List conducted field experiments where subjects were hired for a typing job and for door-to-door fundraising and found subjects exerted larger effort level in group with a higher wage. However, this positive reciprocity was short lived. Researchers have also found that positive reciprocity is smaller than negative reciprocity. In another study, job applicants were hired to catalog books for 6 hours with a pronounced wage, but applicants were later informed with either wage increase or wage cut. Researchers found the decrease in effort in wage cut group was larger than the increase in effort in wage increase group. However, positive reciprocity did not extend to other activities (volunteering to work for one more hour).

== Economic models ==
Existing models of social preferences can be divided into two types: distributive preferences and reciprocal preferences. Distributive preferences are the preferences over the distribution and total magnitude of the payoff among the reference groups, including altruism and spitefulness, fairness and inequity aversion, and efficiency concern. Reciprocal preferences reflect agent's concern over the intention of other's behavior.

=== Pure altruism, warm glow, and spitefulness ===
Pure altruism in economic models represents an agent's concern on other's well-being. A person exhibits altruistic preference if this person's utility increases with other's payoff. A related economic model is impure altruism, or warm-glow, where individuals feel good (i.e. gain a "warm-glow" utility) from doing something good without caring about other's payoff. Spitefulness or envy preference is the opposite of pure altruism. In this instance, an agent's utility decreases with other's payoff.

=== Fairness and inequity aversion ===
Fairness and inequity aversion models capture the agent's concern on the fair distribution of payoffs across agents and especially the aversion to payoff differences. In the Fehr-Schmidt model, an agent compares his payoff to each other opponents in the group. However, the agent's utility decreases with both positive and negative payoff differences between self and each other opponent in the reference group. Moreover, the agent dislikes payoff disadvantage more than payoff advantage. Hence, the agent presents altruistic behavior towards others when agent is better off than others, and displays spiteful behavior when agent is worse off than others.

=== Efficiency concern and quasi-maximin preferences ===
Economists Gary Charness and Matthew Rabin found that in some cases, agents prefer more efficient outcomes (i.e. outcome with larger social welfare) than more equal outcomes and they developed a model where agents' utility is a convex combination of own's material payoff and the social welfare. Moreover, they assumed agents have quasi-maximin preferences, meaning that agents' care on social welfare includes the minimum payoff among agents as well as the total payoff for all agents in the group. However, the agent will care less about others' payoff if other is better off than self.

=== Reciprocity ===
Agent has the motivation to reciprocate towards both kind and unfair behavior. Rabin (1993)'s model is one of the earliest model that characterizes reciprocal behavior. In this model, the agent's payoff depends on the other opponent, and agent forms belief of the other opponent's kindness, which is based on the difference between the actual payoff that agent receives and the fair payoff. Agents will reciprocate positively if he/she perceives the other individual's behavior as kind and fair and respond negatively if he/she perceives it as unfair. Other researchers further generalize Rabin (1993)'s model by studying repeated interactions in N-person extensive form games, and also by including inequity aversion into agent's preference. Charness and Rabin also augmented their quasi-maximin preference with reciprocity concern.

== Economic applications ==
Researchers have argued that the failure of recognizing social preference will lead to a biased understanding of much important economic behavior. Three important ways in which social preferences are applied to real world economics are explained below.

=== Understanding cooperation ===
Research on social preferences showed that reciprocal and inequity averse individuals can cooperate if they are sure that others will cooperate too and can punish the free riders. This has implications for designing proper social mechanisms to solve the free-riding problem. For example, Fischbacher and Gachter found that, through public goods experimentation, people contribute more to public goods than self-interest alone would suggest. This provides support for the notion of voluntary contribution.

=== Design of economic incentive ===
Accounting employee's reciprocity and fairness concerns can help design better contracts (e.g. trust contract, bonus contract) to enhance employee's effort and to solve firm's agency problems. Moreover, the design of relative pay in the workplace can affect employee's job satisfaction and well-being. Research on social preference has also facilitated the understanding of monetary incentives' crowding-out effect.

=== Design of social policies ===
The distributive and reciprocal preferences mentioned previously are integral in good government and the upholding of ethical standards. Without the existence of these preferences, it is unlikely that society would achieve desirable allocations of economic goods due to self-interest and the "free rider" problem. Research and experimentation into social preferences assists in the design of optimal incentives used in public policy. Accounting individual's fairness concerns can affect the design of the social policies, especially for redistributive policies. In addition, reciprocal preferences can affect people's evaluation of different policies towards the poor depending on the individual's belief that whether the poor are deserving or undeserving.

== See also ==
- Altruism
- Homo economicus
- Homo reciprocans
- Inequity Aversion
- Moral psychology
- Neuroeconomics §Social decision making
- Norm of reciprocity – Repayment in kind
- Ophelimity
- Pro-social behavior
- Reciprocity
- Social value orientation
- Warm-glow giving
