= Inequity aversion =

Preference for fairness and resistance to incidental inequalities

Inequity aversion (IA) is the preference for fairness and resistance to incidental inequalities. The social sciences that study inequity aversion include sociology, economics, psychology, anthropology, and ethology. Researchers on inequity aversion aim to explain behaviors that are not purely driven by self-interests but fairness considerations.

In some literature, the terminology inequality aversion was used in the places of inequity aversion. The discourses in social studies argue that "inequality" pertains to the gap between the distribution of resources, while "inequity" pertains to the fundamental and institutional unfairness. Therefore, the choice between using inequity or inequality aversion may depend on the specific context.

== Human studies ==
Inequity aversion research on humans mostly occurs in the discipline of economics though it is also studied in sociology.

Research on inequity aversion began in 1978 when studies suggested that humans are sensitive to inequities in favor of as well as those against them, and that some people attempt overcompensation when they feel "guilty" or unhappy to have received an undeserved reward.

A more recent definition of inequity aversion (resistance to inequitable outcomes) was developed in 1999 by Fehr and Schmidt. They postulated that people make decisions so as to minimize inequity in outcomes. Specifically, consider a setting with individuals {1,2,...,n} who receive pecuniary outcomes x_{i}. Then the utility to person i would be given by

$$U_i(\{x_1,...,x_n\}) = x_i - \frac{\alpha_i}{n-1} \times \sum_{j\neq i}{\max(x_j - x_i,0)} - \frac{\beta_i}{n-1} \times \sum_{j\neq i}{\max(x_i - x_j,0)},$$

where α parametrizes the distaste of person i for disadvantageous inequality in the first nonstandard term, and β parametrizes the distaste of person i for advantageous inequality in the final term. The results suggested that a small fraction of selfish behaviors may influence the majority with a fair mind to act selfishly in some scenarios, while a minority of fair-minded behaviors may also affect selfish players to cooperate in games with punishment. In addition, the inequity aversion mindset may affect market outcomes even in the presence of very competitive competition.

Gary E Bolton and Axel Ockenfels provided a more general model called ERC (equity, reciprocity, and competition) in 2000. The model built on the premise that not only pecuniary but also relative payoff can motivate behaviors. In this model, all payoffs are monetary and nonnegative and players aim to maximize the expected value of motivation function. The motivation function of individual (i) in n players is given by $v_i = v_i (y_i,\sigma_i)$ where
$$\sigma_i=\sigma_i(y_i, c, n) = \begin{cases} y_i/c, & \text{if }c>0 \\ 1/n, & \text{if }c=0 \end{cases}$$
is i's relative share of payoff, and $c=\sum_{j=1}^n y_j$ is the total pecuniary payout. The results showed that the behaviors in various games, including unknown pie-size games, best-shot games, Bertrand and Cournot games, guessing games etc., can be in fact deduced from ultimatum and dictator games.

=== Punishing unjust success and game theory ===
Fehr and Schmidt showed that disadvantageous inequity aversion manifests itself in humans as the "willingness to sacrifice potential gain to block another individual from receiving a superior reward". They argue that this apparently self-destructive response is essential in creating an environment in which bilateral bargaining can thrive. Without inequity aversion's rejection of injustice, stable cooperation would be harder to maintain (for instance, there would be more opportunities for successful free riders).

James H. Fowler and his colleagues also argue that inequity aversion is essential for cooperation in multilateral settings. In particular, they show that subjects in random income games (closely related to public goods games) are willing to spend their own money to reduce the income of wealthier group members and increase the income of poorer group members even when there is no cooperation at stake. Thus, individuals who free ride on the contributions of fellow group members are likely to be punished because they earn more, creating a decentralized incentive for the maintenance of cooperation.

=== Experimental economics ===
Inequity aversion is broadly consistent with observations of behavior in three standard economics experiments:

1. Dictator game – The subject chooses how a reward should be split between themself and another subject. If the dictator acted self-interestedly, the split would consist of 0 for the partner and the full amount for the dictator. While the most common choice is indeed to keep everything, many dictators choose to give, with the second most common choice being the 50:50 split.
2. Ultimatum game – The dictator game is played, but the recipient is allowed to veto the entire deal, so that both subjects receive nothing. The partner typically vetoes the deal when low offers are made. People consistently prefer getting nothing to receiving a small share of the pie. Rejecting the offer is in effect paying to punish the dictator (called the proposer).
3. Trust game – The same result as found in the dictator game shows up when the dictator's initial endowment is provided by their partner, even though this requires the first player to trust that something will be returned (reciprocity). This experiment often yields a 50:50 split of the endowment, and has been used as evidence of the inequity aversion model.

In 2005, John List modified these experiments slightly to determine if something in the construction of the experiments was prompting specific behaviors. When given a choice to steal money from the other player, even a single dollar, the observed altruism all but disappeared. In another experiment, the two players were given a sum of money and the choice to give or take any amount from the other player. In this experiment, only 10% of the participants gave the other person any money at all, and fully 40% of the players opted to take all of the other player's money.

The last such experiment was identical to the former, where 40% were turned into a gang of robbers, with one catch: the two players were forced to earn the money by stuffing envelopes. In this last experiment, more than two thirds of the players neither took nor gave a cent, while just over 20% still took some of the other player's money.

In 2011, Ert, Erev and Roth ran a model prediction competition on two datasets, each of which included 120 two-player games. In each game player 1 decides whether to "opt out" and determine the payoffs for both players, or to "opt in" and let player 2 decide about the payoff allocation by choosing between actions "left" or "right". The payoffs were randomly selected, so the dataset included games like the Ultimatum, Dictator, and Trust, as well as other games. The results suggested that inequity aversion could be described as one of many strategies that people might use in such games.

Other research in experimental economics addresses risk aversion in decision making and the comparison of inequality measures to subjective judgments on perceived inequalities.

=== Studies of companies ===
Surveys of employee opinions within firms have shown modern labor economists that inequity aversion is very important to them. Employees compare not only relative salaries but also relative performance against that of co-workers. Where these comparisons lead to guilt or envy, inequity aversion may lower employee morale. According to Bewley (1999), the main reason that managers create formal pay structures is so that the inter-employee comparison is seen to be "fair", which they considered "key" for morale and job performance.

It is natural to think of inequity aversion leading to greater solidarity within the labor pool, to the benefit of the average employee. However, a 2008 paper by Pedro Rey-Biel shows that this assumption can be subverted, and that an employer can use inequity aversion to get higher performance for less pay than would be possible otherwise. This is done by moving away from formal pay structures and using off-equilibrium bonus payments as incentives for extra performance. He shows that the optimal contract for inequity aversion employees is less generous at the optimal production level than contracts for "standard agents" (who don't have inequity aversion) in an otherwise identical two-employee model.

=== Criticisms ===
In 2005 Avner Shaked distributed a "pamphlet" entitled "The Rhetoric of Inequity Aversion" that attacked the inequity aversion papers of Fehr & Schmidt. In 2010, Shaked has published an extended version of the criticism together with Ken Binmore in the Journal of Economic Behavior and Organization (the same issue also contains a reply by Fehr and Schmidt and a rejoinder by Binmore and Shaked). A problem of inequity aversion models is the fact that there are free parameters; standard theory is simply a special case of the inequity aversion model. Hence, by construction inequity aversion must always be at least as good as standard theory when the inequity aversion parameters can be chosen after seeing the data. Binmore and Shaked also point out that Fehr and Schmidt (1999) pick a distribution of alpha and beta without conducting a formal estimation. The perfect correlation between the alpha and beta parameters in Fehr and Schmidt (1999) is an assumption made in the appendix of their paper that is not justified by the data that they provide.

More recently, several papers have estimated Fehr-Schmidt inequity aversion parameters using estimation techniques such as maximum likelihood. The results are mixed. Some authors have found beta larger than alpha, which contradicts a central assumption made by Fehr and Schmidt (1999). Other authors have found that inequity aversion with Fehr and Schmidt's (1999) distribution of alphas and betas explains data of contract-theoretic experiments not better than standard theory; they also estimate average values of alpha that are much smaller than suggested by Fehr and Schmidt (1999). Moreover, Levitt and List (2007) have pointed out that laboratory experiments tend to exaggerate the importance of pro-social behaviors because the subjects in the laboratory know that they are being monitored.

An alternative to the concept of a general inequity aversion is the assumption that the degree and the structure of inequality could lead either to acceptance or to aversion of inequality.

=== Limitations and future investigations ===
Fehr and Schmidt proposed that additional research on the inequity aversion should emphasize explicitly formalizing the role of intentions and conducting more thorough testing of the theory against alternative hypotheses.

Bolton and Ockenfels recommended that the ERC model would benefit from a dynamic theory support and additional research in order to effectively explain more complex games and games that occur over longer time spans. An advanced definition on social preference and a more formal quantitative model would also be worth investigating.

== Non-human studies ==
An experiment on capuchin monkeys (Brosnan, S and de Waal, F) showed that the subjects would prefer receiving nothing to receiving a reward awarded inequitably in favor of a second monkey, and appeared to target their anger at the researchers responsible for the inequitable distribution of food. Anthropologists suggest that this research indicates a biological and evolutionary sense of social "fair play" in primates, though others believe that this is learned behavior or explained by other mechanisms. There is also evidence for inequity aversion in chimpanzees (though see a recent study questioning this interpretation). The latest study shows that chimpanzees play the Ultimatum Game in the same way as children, preferring equitable outcomes. The authors claim that we now are near the point of no difference between humans and apes with regard to a sense of fairness. Recent studies suggest that animals in the canidae family also recognize a basic level of fairness, stemming from living in cooperative societies. Animal cognition studies in other biological orders have not found similar importance on relative "equity" and "justice" as opposed to absolute utility.

== Social inequity aversion ==
Fehr and Schmidt's model may partially explain the widespread opposition to economic inequality in democracies, but a distinction should be drawn between inequity aversion's "guilt" and egalitarianism's "compassion", which does not necessarily imply injustice.

Inequity aversion should not be confused with the arguments against the consequences of inequality. For example, the pro-publicly funded health care slogan "Hospitals for the poor become poor hospitals" directly objects to a predicted decline in medical care, not the health-care apartheid that is supposed to cause it. The argument that average medical outcomes improve with reduction in healthcare inequality (at the same total spending) is separate from the case for public healthcare on the grounds of inequity aversion.

== See also ==
- Altruism
- Behavioral economics
- Equality of outcome
- Equity theory
- Norm of reciprocity
- Reciprocity (cultural anthropology)
- Risk aversion
- Social preferences
