= Gift-exchange game =

Type of game theory

The gift-exchange game, also commonly known as the gift exchange dilemma, is a common economic game introduced by George Akerlof and Janet Yellen to model reciprocacy in labor relations. The gift-exchange game simulates a labor-management relationship execution problem in the principal-agent problem in labor economics. The simplest form of the game involves two players – an employee and an employer. The employer first decides whether they should award a higher salary to the employee. The employee then decides whether to reciprocate with a higher level of effort (work harder) due to the salary increase or not. Like trust games, gift-exchange games are used to study reciprocity for human subject research in social psychology and economics. If the employer pays extra salary and the employee puts in extra effort, then both players are better off than otherwise. The relationship between an investor and an investee has been investigated as the same type of a game.

The gift exchange game serves as a valuable lens through which to understand economic theory as it demonstrates that self-interest maximization is not the sole determinant of economic decision-making. Rather, reciprocity is a fundamental factor that shapes individuals' behaviour in economic contexts. By simulating labor relations between an employer and employee, the game explicates that when employer offer a higher salary, employees are more inclined to reciprocate with great effort, leading to mutually beneficial outcomes. Gift exchange games have been used to study economic and social phenomena such as labor contracts, market transactions, strike and the decline of unionization. The gift-exchange theory also incorporates a social component, where homogenous agents who are employed with an equivalent wage level will exert greater effort. This then continues to result in a higher market efficiency and higher rent than those agents receiving different wages. The first examination of this component is referred to as the fair uniform-wage hypothesis, where experiments establish the significant efficiency premium of uniform wages. However, this is not a consequential result of a stronger level or reciprocity by the agents, although the reinforcement of endorsing these options on the side of principals with uniform wages is why implementing boundaries to freedom can lead to efficiency-enhancing results.

== Equilibrium analysis ==
In the game theory, the equilibrium analysis can be implemented to determine and examine strategic decisions between the players in a game. Nash equilibrium is the situation of a game where no player has an incentive to change the strategy given the strategic decision based on the other player. It is implemented to evaluate these situations and the decisions by the players that are made affecting each players out come. The extra effort in gift-exchange games is modelled to be a negative payoff if not compensated by salary. The IKEA effect of own extra work is not considered in the payoff structure of this game. Therefore, this model rather fits labor conditions, which are less meaningful for the employees.

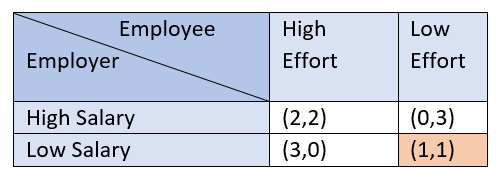
Normal form of gift exchange game

Like in trust games, game-theoretic solution for rational players predicts that employees’ effort will be minimum for one-shot and finitely repeated interactions. The difference constitutes by the sequentiality of gift-exchange game. In the gift exchange game, the employer pays a high or low salary first and then the employee makes the decision. So employers have no incentive to pay high salaries if workers know what they are choosing. If the employer pays a higher salary, it is irrational for the employee to put extra effort, since effort will reduce his or her payoff. It is also irrational for the employee to put extra effort while receiving a lower salary. Therefore, the minimum salary and the minimum effort is the equilibrium of this game.

Idealistic representation of gift-exchange game in extensive form. This game has only one single Nash equilibrium. Actions predicted by this equilibrium are colored black.

As this game is considered a perfect information game where all players are aware of previous actions, backwards induction can also be used to determine the equilibrium of this game. As both players are rational, they will both work to maximise their utility. Looking at game tree shown on the right, the last decision is determined by the employee. The utilities for the employer and employee are outlined in red and blue respectively. In both a high and low salary option, the employee will benefit more from choosing the low effort option. In a high salary path, the high effort choice yields a utility of 2 for the employee whereas in the low effort path the utility is 3. In the low salary high effort path, the employees utility will be 0 compared to the low effort choice which results in a utility of 1. Thus the employee will choose low effort regardless of the salary choice made by the employer. Moving a decision back, it is now the employers choice between high or low salary. Knowing the employee will choose low effort, the employer will also choose the option that maximises their utility. In the high salary low effort option, their utility eventuates to 0 whereas in the low salary low effort option, their utility is 1. Knowing the employee will choose the low effort option as it maximises their utility, the employer will choose low salary. This will lead to the equilibrium of low salary and low effort.

== Contrast with Prisoner's dilemma ==
The payoff matrix of the gift-exchange game has the same structure as the payoff matrix of prisoner's dilemma when strategies are involved in the decision-making between the players. However, there are key differences between the two games. The difference constitutes by the sequentiality of gift-exchange game, with the gift exchange games being based on social norms of reciprocity, where participants are incentivized to act in ways that other players deem fair. The goal of the game is to maximize the amount of money each player receives, and to follow the expectations of the group. Although, in contrast to the prisoner's dilemma two participants are faced with either cooperation or betrayal, without knowing what the other players will decide and the payoff of each possible outcome is determined by the choices of both players. The prisoner's dilemma aims to show how rational decisions can lead to sub-optimal outcomes for both parties, even when cooperation is in the best interest of both parties. The goal of both games is to maximize the amount of money each player receives, but in the prisoner's dilemma, rational decisions can lead to sub-optimal outcomes for both parties, even when cooperation is in the best interest of both players. In the gift-exchange game, the choices of all players are interdependent, and the social norms of reciprocity incentivize participants to act in ways that benefit the group as a whole. In our follow-up experiments with the gift exchange game, we found that only a few people in the real world would choose the minimum wage and minimum effort to reach the Nash equilibrium.

== Experimental Methods and Results ==
A positive relationship between salary and effort has been observed in a large number of gift-exchange experiments performed in a laboratory setting. This behaviour obviously deviates from the equilibrium.

A study on 84 undergraduate students at the University of Amsterdam was conducted to observe the difference in findings that were predicted to occur when the gift-exchange game performed between one employer one employee was compared to a game performed between one employer and four employees. The results indicated the number of employees did not have a significant impact on the level of effort that was chosen, with both mean effort levels increasing with wage at similar rates.

Another experiment with students from Tilburg University showed that only 33% of games ended up in the Nash equilibrium with minimal salary and minimal effort. Data from another experiment on 123 students from University of Nottingham showed a rate of 69% for high salary being paid by employer in advance.

Fehr, Kirchsteiger and Riedl (1993, QJE) designed a market in which "employers" and "employees" do not meet. All wages and effort and "employees" are put in different rooms for many experiments, and are told that the counterparties of each transaction are different, and both sides keep "anonymous" transactions from beginning to end. In this way, the influence of expectations of both sides on the "long-term future" is excluded, and the choice of the level of effort of "employees" is completely self-conscious. According to the traditional economic view, employees will be willing to accept any wage greater than 0, and provide the minimum level of effort after receiving the salary. However, the experimental results show that employers always offer wages much higher than the minimum level, while employees almost always provide efforts much higher than the minimum level. This proves that even if there are no other supervision and punishment mechanisms, the wage level in the labor market is often higher than the market-clearing price for some "fair" and "goodwill" motives in exchange for the labor provider's initiative and loyalty. It's also an example of how social norms and reciprocity can affect human behavior even in the absence of regulation.

The experiment of charness (2000, JEBO) wanted to explore what would happen if the benefit of high wages was not given by the employer but a random result or a third party. The results of this experiment are as follows: (1) if wages are generated randomly, employees usually give extra efforts to show "fairness" or compensation, considering that they are after all the employer's money. (2) If, at almost the same income level, employees are told that the wage level is determined by the experimenter, they will think that they don't have to pay a lot of responsibility for the "loss" to the employer, so they will relatively reduce their efforts.

Gneezy and List (2006, Econometrica) were two of the first economists to investigate whether similar results found in the previous laboratory experiments could be replicated in a field setting. They did so by conducting two separate experiments, each involving a number of volunteer participants who were required to perform a specific task for six hours in total. Each participant would receive an hourly wage that had been previously advertised to them. The participants in each experiment were divided into two groups, one of which were informed that the actual wage they would be receiving was higher than the wage advertised to them. Each of the two experiments yielded similar results. For both experiments, the group receiving the increased wage only performed the task more efficiently in the initial stage of the task. Towards the end of the six hours, the groups yielded similar outputs and were performing at the same productivity level. While these results are inconsistent with previous laboratory finds, they endorse one feature of "reciprocal behaviour", that is, as time goes on, preferential treatment will be taken for granted, thus reducing the willingness of employees to supply labour.

Some other observations noted about whether players will follow the expected nash equilibrium or were more likely to deviate and provide the gift and extra effort included, how much the game was repeated and if the players were familiar to each other. Players who were strangers or had not entered the game as many times before were far more likely to follow the Nash equilibrium, unable to achieve the higher possible pay-offs. However, if the game is repeated more times or the players were 'partners' (worked together and knew each other better) they had far greater success at maintaining higher pay-offs in the game. This study published by the Tinbergen Institute also concluded that ‘simpler’ or smaller gifts were far more likely to be reciprocated and maintained appropriately than larger gifts that could be more appealing to exploit. Van Den Akker, Olmo R. van Assen et al. found that subjects in the gift-exchange game exhibit selfish behaviour in specific labour markets and other principal-agent environments.

Chaudhuri, Ananish Sbai, Erwann found in a study of sex differences in trust and reciprocity in repeated gift exchange games that there were no significant gender differences in trust, and women performed better in reciprocity. However, when the experimental context was placed in a specific labor market, female reciprocity performance decreased.

Kean Siang, Ch'Ng's experiment explores the role of relative information and reciprocity in the gift-exchange game. They found that lack of enforcement was not the only reason to explain employees' reluctance to work hard, so the concept of 'relative reciprocal' was creatively introduced. There is a problem of information asymmetry between employees and employers. When employees have access to market information about average wages, they decide whether to work hard or not by comparing their current wage with the average wage and getting a relative reciprocal from their employer. But this increases the pressure on employers and competition between them, as wages are determined by the market offer. Especially, in organizations where control is separated from ownership, the relationship between wage increases and effort cannot be observed through the relative reciprocal.

Moreover, Tagiew and Ignatov (2014) have conducted an experiment at the University of Nottingham using one-shot games, where participants did not participate more than once. The study included participates of both genders, with an average age of 20. Each game involved three players, an originator and two followers, who had the option to award or not award each other with gifts. The originator received an initial amount of £8.3, and each follower received £11.1. The originator could offer a fixed amount of £1.6 to a follower, while a follower could give £1, £2, or £3, with a corresponding reduction in their payoff. The experiment aimed to explore the effects of gift-giving on the players' payoffs and the dynamics of reciprocity. The study found that the frequency of non-gift giving was lower than what an egoistic payoff maximization assumption would predict, with an average non-gift frequency of 69% in the studied one-shot games. However, it was still over 50% in almost all cases. The paragraph also notes that it is difficult to create models of human behavior without access to the hidden variables that determine the players' choices.

This game can help us to understand strikes, coordination, and dismissal in uniform wage settings. In a gift-exchange game in a multi-employee environment with collective action mechanisms, the employer offers a uniform wage. The breakdown of trust and reciprocity between employers and employees due to free-riding at work can lead to employee strikes or the intervention of unions and other labor organizations to coordinate. As the employer pays a flat wage, such collective action may prompt the employer to resort to dismissal mechanisms, i.e. firing the free-riding. If unions and other labor organizations step in to coordinate, employees may face increased employment risks in the absence of success in reducing free-rider behavior. These effects may help to understand the reasons for the decline in unionization in developed economies. For example, in the US, companies adopt enterprise resource planning and applications to simplify the adjustment of wage differentiation.

A recent study in 2023 showed that in the gift-exchange game of labor relations, employees' costless and non-binding voice leads firms to reduce the actual workload in agreed contracts rather than increase wages.

== Critique ==
Dirk Engelmann and Andreas Ortmann’s study: ‘The Robustness Of Laboratory Gift exchange: A Reconsideration’ took a subject pool of students from economics and business courses at the University of Berlin and the Institute For Empirical Research In Economics at the University of Zurich and had participants randomly selected into a employer or employee category. The managers would offer the workers a wage and an effort level that was required and the workers would choose to accept or decline the offer. The acceptance rate for the groups according to effort and wage were measured. The study suggested that there was little evidence for positive reciprocity and that laboratory gift exchange is highly sensitive to the parametrization of the model and the way the model is implemented. Engelmann also found that workers experienced negative reciprocity to negative wages. Engelmann suggested that gift-exchange is highly sensitive to changes in the parameters of the game (parametrization), the framing effect and anonymity. This has important consequence for empirical implementation.

Gary Charness, Guillaume R. Frechette, and John H. Kagel’s experiment, 'How Robust is Laboratory Gift Exchange?', studied the effect of gift-exchange in the US. While they found positive reciprocity attributable to the gift-exchange effect, they also found that the gift-exchange effect is sensitive to innocuous changes. Groups of consisting of an employer and an employee were chosen whereby the employer chooses the wage for their employee. employees were paid for their work at a self-chosen effort level and the corresponding cost of effort for that level. one group was presented with a payoff table, detailing employee and employer wages and the other ignorant of potential payoff. Charness found that when a payoff table was included in the experiment that demarcated the relationship between wages, effort and payoff, gift exchange was sharply reduced. Charness suggests that this reduction in gift exchange could be due to the framing effect. The framing affect would reduce positive reciprocation by reducing the positive effect caused by an unexpected bonus and replacing it with a mutual understanding of the firms expectations.

== Reciprocity & Social Norms ==
Reciprocity is a fundamental concept within game theory that offers the idea that agents are more likely to cooperate if they believe that the cooperation will be reciprocated back. Ie. You do something for me, I’ll do something for you; a mutual gain. Within the gift exchange game, it has been identified within numerous large-scale studies that the higher the gift the higher the quality levels or effort put in. An example of reciprocity due to social norms was a field study conducted by the University of Bon to investigate the gift exchange theory in a natural setting. Findings found that out of roughly 10,000 solicitation letter to potential donors, one third contained no gift to accompany the call for donations, one third a small gift and one third a large gift with random assignments. The data confirmed that potential donors were much more likely to donate with the relative frequency being 75% more likely to receive a donation from a large gift recipient. These results are backed by a number of similar studies from University of Amsterdam, Tilburg University and University of Nottingham with the data showing a contrast to what is considered the nash equilibrium.

The results demonstrate the commonality for individuals to experience a feeling of duty or reciprocate actions with commensurate worth or significance. To put in other words, If the employer expects the employee to put in a higher effort when offered a higher salary it may be in the employees best interests to put in a greater effort. Additionally, if the employee puts in a higher effort it may result in an increase in wage down the track. Thus indicating that the gift exchange game may have multiple equilibria, dependant on expectations, beliefs and if social preferences are two-sided.

Reciprocity within the gift exchange game shows how social interaction play a large role in what are considered economic decisions and is the factor that balances and maintains the stability between give and take. In recognising the important of reciprocity, employees and employers can foster advantageous relationships with others to contribute to more harmonious and productive relations.

== Work Field usage ==
The gift exchange model is used to explain workers' effort and wages provided by firms in the real world, especially involuntary unemployment. George A. Akerlof described labor contracts as "partial gift exchange". Unlike what is depicted in the simple model above, in real life, employees may exceed the minimum work required and firms may pay more than the market-clearing wage. According to Akerlof's model, this is because the worker’s effort not only depends on the effort itself, wage rate if employed, and the unemployed benefit if unemployed, but also the norm for effort. Thus, to affect these norms, firms may pay more.

Akerlof's model has become the topic of several experiments aimed at understanding employee motivation and behaviour, as well as the effect of fairness from employers. The results of these experiments have been mixed and are highly dependent on the experimental setting. Several studies have been conducted in a laboratory setting, such as Fehr, Kirchsteiger, and Riedl (1993), which have presented strong evidence of the relationship between increased fixed wages and its influence in eliciting positive reciprocity from employees in the form of increased effort. However, these results have not been reflected in field studies, which have largely found no or little evidence of the relationship. Kube, Marechal, and Puppe (2012) found that in the field setting, there was no significant increase in effort after increased fixed wages. However, they did find that gifts of equivalent value that took alternative forms than fixed wages significantly increased effort.

One particular non-monetary gift believed to incentivise employees is the attention they receive from their employer. In a model developed by Prof. Robert Dur, altruistic managers who signal a level of attention towards their employees can achieve the same level of output as an egoistic manager (who doesn't provide any attention to their employees) who is paying a higher wage to retain their employees. Eventually, the altruistic manager's marginal cost of attention exceeds a point where increasing the employees wage becomes a better alternative. This outcome is dependent on the employee exhibiting "neutral" or "warm" feelings towards their employer such that their expected utility increases with the attention they receive. Rather than contradict, this model supplements traditional game-exchange theory by demonstrating in a real world setting, managers have socioemotional tools at their disposal that may be preferred to a monetary gift.

Many laboratory experiments support the theory of using gift exchange as an incentive mechanism. However, field evidence has resulted in conflicting effectiveness. A study conducted by Evesteves-Sorenson and Macera (2013) aimed to investigate removing any theoretical factors that could be “dampening gift exchange in the field”. The study identified a few factors that could be impacting gift exchange effectiveness such as “habituation to the gift, fatigue, and small gift size”. Accounting for these factors and subsequently implementing a field experiment to remove them, the study’s results found no evidence to support gift exchange in the work place.

The multitude of factors for this discrepancy between laboratory and field settings is the topic of much subsequent research, but it is not entirely clear. While conflicting results do degrade the reliability of the application of the gift exchange game, It still provides valuable insight into employee and employer behavior.

== Other fields usages ==
The gift-exchange game is not only used in the workplace but can also be practiced in other areas. For example, in the field of charitable giving, when a charity first makes a gift to a potential donor as part of a donation solicitation, more generous gifts are associated with higher frequency donations, resulting in more donations to the charity.

Some user interaction systems use the gift-exchange game as the right gamification model.

== Modification of game conditions usage ==
The experiment of Franke et al is based on a modified gift-exchange game, where workers can participate in wage setting. The results of this experiment show that when workers have the right to make wage decisions, they show a positive incentive to work harder. However, if firms want employees to exert high effort, firms need to offer high enough offers or delegate substantial decisions to employees. In practical applications, different mechanisms of co-determination might lead to very different incentive structures and performance outcomes.

Most laboratory and field studies regarding the gift-exchange game focus on a bilateral relationship (one employee and one employer). An experiment conducted by Maximiano, Sloof and Sonnemans (2013) focused on creating a more complex laboratory environment to allow for further extrapolation of the results into real world relationships found in the labour market. The paper explored multi-level hierarchies and focused on the complex structure where “ownership and control are separated”. The classical gift-exchange game was manipulated to mimic a trilateral relationship where the firm is controlled by a manager but owned by a shareholder. This experiment found that employees rewarded higher wages with higher effort regardless of whether the manager shared in the firms’ profits or not.

== See also ==
- Trust game
- Prisoner's dilemma
- Ultimatum game
- Efficiency wage
