= Holding value =

In the field of financial economics, Holding value is an indicator of a theoretical value of an asset that someone has in their portfolio. It is a value which sums the impacts of all the dividends that would be given to the holder in the future, to help them estimate a price to buy or sell assets.

== Expression ==
The following formula gives the holding value (HV) for a period beginning at i through the period n.

${HV}_{[i,n]}=\sum_{k=0}^{n-i}\frac{div(i+k)}{{(1+r)}^{n-i-k}}$ where

div = dividend

r = interest rate (of the money if it is kept at the bank; e.g., 0.02 or 2%)

i = the period at the beginning of the estimation

n = the last period considered in the window of future dividends.
