= Public goods game =

Experimental economics game

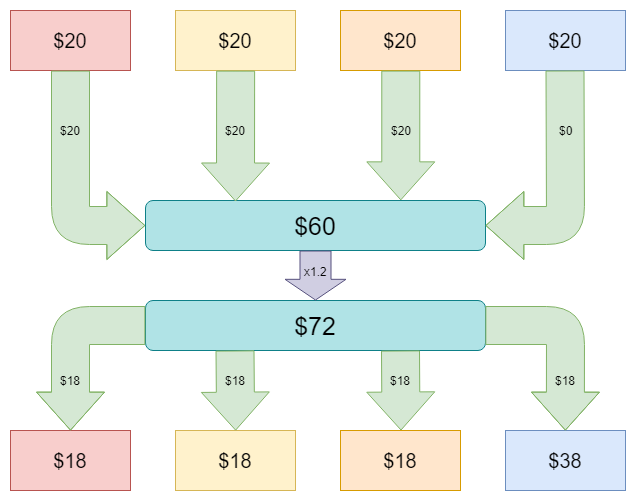
In this diagram of a public goods game, three players choose to contribute their full $20 while the fourth player chooses to contribute $0. The $60 is multiplied by a factor of 1.2 and the resulting $72 is distributed equally among the four players.

The public goods game is a standard of experimental economics. In the basic game, subjects secretly choose how many of their private tokens to put into a public pot. The payoff of each player is their "private consumption" (their endowment minus their contribution) plus their benefit from the "public good" (the sum of contributions multiplied by a factor). The game is used to study degree of altruism and cooperation between individuals.

== Introduction ==
Public goods games are fundamental in experimental economics. The nature of the experiment is incentives and the problem of free riding. Public goods games investigate the incentives of individuals who free-ride off individuals who are contributing to the common pool.

A public goods game investigates behavioural economics and the actions of the players in the game. In this process, it seeks to use behavioural economics to understand the decisions of its players. It extends further to free-riding, which has far-reaching applications to environmental, managerial and social economics. Public goods games are valuable in understanding the role of incentives in an individual's behaviours. They arise from behavioural economics and have broad applications to societal challenges. Examples of applications include environmental policy, legal and justice issues and workplace and organisational structures.

== Description of the game and result ==
Consider a group of individuals consists of $n$ identical individuals. Each individual is endowed with $M$ tokens and must decide how many tokens to allocate to a public "pot" (public good).

The payoff of each individual $i$ is

$$\pi_i=M- g_i + a\sum_{j=1}^n g_j,$$

where $a$ is a constant multiplication factor and $g_i$ is the contribution of individual $i$ to the public good. Therefore, $M-g_i$ is her private consumption and $a\sum_{j=1}^n g_j$ is her benefit from the public good.

=== Optimum ===
To find the optimal contribution we shall maximize the payoff of the representative individual:

$$\max_g\,(M-g+ang)$$

The derivative with respect to $g$ is $-1 + an$. Note that if $an> 1$, then the optimal contribution is $M$ since the first derivative is positive.

=== Nash equilibrium ===
If $a<1$ then given other individuals' contributions individual $i$ maximizes her payoff by contributing 0. If she contributes 1 token, her private consumption decreases by 1 and her benefit from public consumption increases by $a<1$. Therefore, at the Nash equilibrium each individual contributes 0.

The public good game is easily translated to a laboratory experiment. If individuals are purely egoistic then we will end up in no contributions. If individuals are pure altruistic then we will end up in individuals contributing their entire endowments. An experimental result between the two extremes, shows the degree of altruism (or egoism).

In fact, the Nash equilibrium is rarely seen in experiments; people do tend to add something into the pot. The actual levels of contribution found varies widely (anywhere from 0% to 100% of initial endowment can be chipped in). The average contribution typically depends on the multiplication factor. Capraro has proposed a new solution concept for social dilemmas, based on the idea that players forecast if it is worth to act cooperatively and then they act cooperatively in a rate depending on the forecast. His model indeed predicts increasing level of cooperation as the multiplication factor increases.

Depending on the experimental design, those who contribute below average or nothing are called "defectors" or "free riders", as opposed to the contributors or above-average contributors who are called "cooperators".

We can take a deeper look at the public goods game. In fact, intergroup competition has a large effect on the public goods game. In Jonathan et al.'s experiment, they compared linear public goods games without comparison (PG), with comparison but without incentives to win (XPG), or with incentives to win (CPG).

Throughout the experiment, they found that in one-shot games, competition increases cooperation with/out incentives, while in finitely repeated games, cooperation is sustained with incentives. Cooperation decreases (increases) in response to wins (losses).

On a cognitive level, intergroup comparisons can enhance (diminish) the salience of the group (individual) objective – a common goal – and also how closely one identifies with the group. In turn, the more a rational individual "reasons for the team" i.e., behave as a component of a profile maximizing the group's objective, the more cooperation is expected. Linking monetary incentives to group success further enhances the salience of the group objective, and thus intra-group cooperation.

== Variants ==
=== Iterated public goods games ===
"Repeat-play" public goods games involve the same group of subjects playing the basic game over a series of rounds. The typical result is a declining proportion of public contribution, from the simple game (the "One-shot" public goods game). When trusting contributors see that not everyone is giving up as much as they do they tend to reduce the amount they share in the next round. If this is again repeated the same thing happens but from a lower base, so that the amount contributed to the pot is reduced again. However, the amount contributed to the pool rarely drops to zero when rounds of the game are iterated, because there tends to remain a hard core of "givers". This effect is called the end-game effect.

One explanation for the dropping level of contribution is inequity aversion. During repeated games, players learn their co-players inequality aversion in previous rounds on which future beliefs can be based. If players receive a bigger share for a smaller contribution the sharing members react against the perceived injustice (even though the identity of the "free riders" are unknown, and it's only a game). Those who contribute nothing in one round, rarely contribute something in later rounds, even after discovering that others are.

=== Open public goods games (transparency) ===
Transparency about past choices and payoffs of group members affects future choices. Studies show individuals in groups can be influenced by the group leaders, whether formal or informal, to conform or defect. Players signal their intentions through transparency which allows "conditional operators" to follow the lead. If players are informed of individual payoffs of each member of the group it can lead to a dynamic of players adopting the strategy of the player who benefited the most (contributed the least) in the group. This can lead a drop in cooperation through subsequent iterations of the game. However, if the amount contributed by each group member is not hidden, the amount contributed tends to be significantly higher. The finding is robust in different experiment designs: Whether in "pairwise iterations" with only two players (the other player's contribution level is always known) or in nominations after the end of the experiment.

=== Public goods games with punishment and/or reward ===
The option to punish non-contributors and to reward the highest contributions after a round of the public goods game has been the issue of many experiments. Findings strongly suggest that non-rewarding is not seen as a sanction, while rewards don't substitute punishment. Rather they are used completely differently as a means to enforce cooperation and higher payoffs.

Punishing is exercised, even at a cost, and in most experiments it leads to greater group cooperation. However, since punishment is costly, it tends to lead to (marginally) lower payoffs, at least initially. In contrast, in the long term, punishment seems to be more efficient, since costs decrease. On the other hand, a 2007 study found that rewards alone could not sustain long-term cooperation. Many studies, therefore, emphasize the combination of (the threat of) punishment and rewards. The combination seems to yield both a higher level of cooperation and payoffs. This holds for iterated games in changing groups as well as in identical groups.

Not limited to rewards, the combination of punishment mechanisms and other strategies can also show an effect on directing to cooperation in a promising way.

=== Asymmetric costs and/or benefits ===
Researchers conducted experiments in different scenarios where endowments are symmetric, weak-asymmetric, strong-asymmetric, etc. The result shows that strong-asymmetric groups tend to contribute less to the public. It could be explained intuitively by "The super-rich player tends to contribute an amount that is not significantly different from the average contribution of the poor players".

It could be concluded that for strong asymmetric scenario, the poor would gain much less profit with higher Gini coefficient.

There are other researches on the effect of "kings and bosses", especially on whether they would affect the outcome and could be rationalized.

=== Income variation ===
A public goods games variant suggested as an improvement for researching the free-rider problem is one in which endowment are earned as income. The standard game (with a fixed initial endowment) allows no work effort variation and cannot capture the marginal substitutions among three factors: private goods, public goods, and leisure.

Researchers have found that in an experiment where an agent's wealth at the end of period t serves as their endowment in t+1, the amounts contributed increase over time even in the absence of punishment strategies.

=== Framing ===
A different framing of the original neutral experiment setting induces players to act differently because they associate different real-life situations. For example, a public good experiment could be presented as a climate negotiation or as contributions to private parties.

The effect of associations (label frame) depends on the experience pool the player made with similar real-life frames. This is especially true for one-shot (not iterated) games where players can only infer others' behaviour and expectations from their life experiences. Therefore, the same frame can induce more and also less contribution, even in similar cultures. Label frames move beliefs i.e. about other player's behaviour, and these beliefs subsequently shape motivation and choice.

Also, the same game structure can always be presented as a gain or a loss game. Because of the framing effect players respond completely differently when it is presented as a gain or a loss. If public good games are presented as a loss, i.e. a player's contribution in a private engagement diminishes other player's payoff, contributions are significantly lower.

== Multiplication factor ==
For contribution to be privately "irrational" the tokens in the pot must be multiplied by an amount smaller than the number of players and greater than 1. Other than this, the level of multiplication has little bearing on strategy, but higher factors produce higher proportions of contribution.

With a large group (40) and a very low multiplication factor (1.03), almost no one contributes anything after a few iterations of the game (a few still do). However, with the same size group and a 1.3 multiplication factor the average level of initial endowment contributed to the pot is around 50%.

== Implications ==
The name of the game comes from economists' definition of a "public good". One type of public good is a costly, "non-excludable" project that everyone can benefit from, regardless of how much they contribute to create it (because no one can be excluded from using it—like street lighting). Part of the economic theory of public goods is that they would be under-provided (at a rate lower than the "social optimum") because individuals had no private motive to contribute (the free rider problem). The "public goods game" is designed to test this belief and connected theories of social behaviour.

=== Inequality in the public goods game ===
Previous studies on public goods games have explored the effect inequality in endowment has on the contributions made by individuals. The effects of inequality cause some individuals to shirk and free-ride on the other players of the game. This has far-reaching consequences for the equality of wealth in the game. The evidence provided from studies is that often contributions are lower when there is inequality in endowment.

Through another lens, inequality influences the contributions that individuals are making to the game. A study demonstrated that the inequality in endowment and contributions creates an asymmetry of punishment in the game, which introduced an asymmetry in power for players. This has further applications to modern-day workplace arrangements and notably, the issue of shirking in group projects.

=== Shirking ===
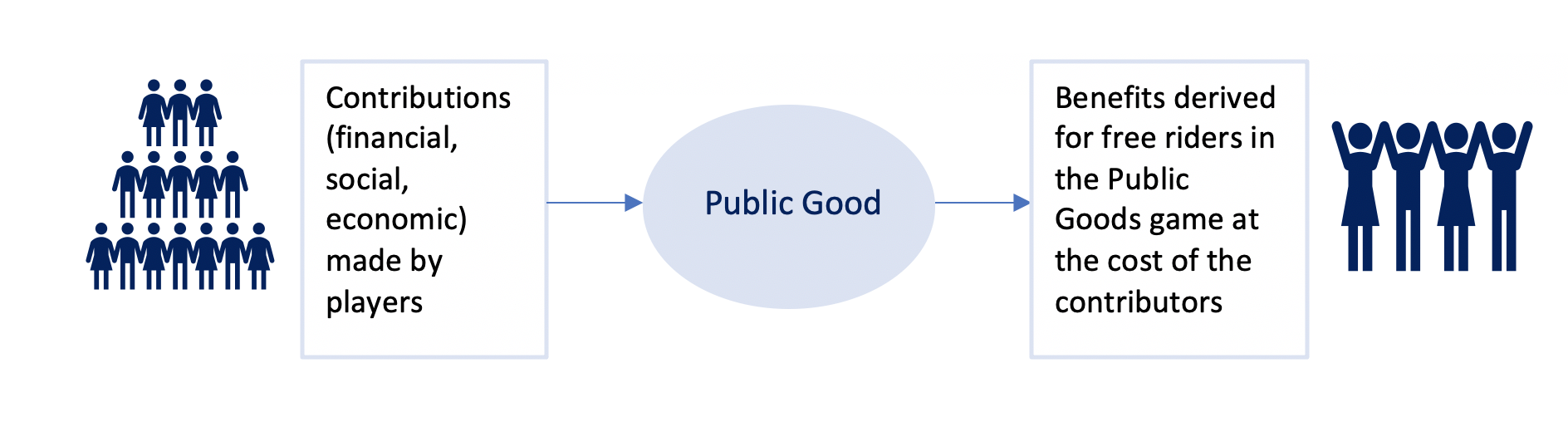
The influence of the free-riding in the public goods game and the influence this has on cooperation.

Shirking in the public goods game may arise through an asymmetry in power created by the punishment in the game. An additional influence in this is the role of inequality in wealth in the public goods game. In this, an individual may shirk and use their higher wealth to punish the group members with lower wealth. Their goal from this is to increase their own wealth and gains from their decisions. Shirking is evident in many workplace arrangements and is studied in the field of managerial economics.

=== Game theory ===
The empirical fact that subjects in most societies contribute anything in the simple public goods game is a challenge for game theory to explain via a motive of total self-interest, although it can do better with the "punishment" variant or the "iterated" variant; because some of the motivation to contribute is now purely "rational" if players assume that others may act irrationally and punish them for non-contribution.

== Applications ==
=== Applications to organisations ===
The public goods game explores the role of an incentive in decisions and the actions of players. An application of this is incentives and how workers respond to different projects. These incentives may extend to institutional incentives, including bonuses and financial rewards. An application of this is workforce incentives for team projects. The public goods game is relevant to this situation as it analyses the contribution employees are willing to make to team projects when there is an incentive to contribute. Resultant of this incentive, the public goods game may create punishments for individuals who do not contribute effectively.

=== Applications to sociology ===
The sociological interpretation of these results emphasizes group cohesion and cultural norms to explain the "prosocial" outcomes of public goods games.

== Additional contributing factors in the public goods game ==
=== Rational choice theory ===
Previous studies have demonstrated the role of behavioural economics—particularly personality traits—and their influence on players' behaviour. However, minimal studies are investigating the role of rationality in player's decision making. Applying rational choice theory to public goods games offers benefits in understanding the contributions players are willing to make and the trends that arise across players and their behaviour. A study that explored this found that rationality has a statistically significant effect on the public goods game. Furthermore, the study found that rational individuals are more likely to contribute fewer resources to public goods.

=== Pareto optimality in the public goods games ===
As there is a Nash equilibrium established in the linear public goods games, there are opportunities to create a Pareto optimal allocation. Michael Pickhardt began research into applications of the linear public goods games and their relationship to Pareto optimal allocations. His findings evidenced that smaller groups in the public goods games are more likely to have higher optimal ratios over the total ratios. This finding demonstrates the applicability of Pareto optimality in understanding the provision of public goods in the public goods game. The conclusions drawn from these findings show the impacts teams have on workplace projects and their ability to meet the overall requirements of their task.

=== Incentives in the public goods game ===
Incentives are fundamental in the public goods game as they provide an opportunity to understand the decisions and actions of the players. Examples of incentives may include financial, economic, and incentives or negative responses such as punishment. The type of incentive offered varies across organisations. An example includes donations made to support a corporate social responsibility initiative of a company.

The incentives in the public goods game also offer benefits in understanding the decisions behind an individual choosing to cooperate. A study exploring the role of social incentives discussed that donations made to charities increase the cooperation between players when in one-shot public goods games. Through a different lens, negative incentives also influence the behaviour and decisions of the players. As punishment is often an incentive in the public goods games, it impacts the cooperation of others in the public goods games. A study conducted by Ernst Fehr and Simon Gachter found that contributions are often higher with punishment than those made without punishment.

== See also ==
- The Evolution of Cooperation
- Dictator game
- Prisoner's dilemma
- Social loafing
- Social preferences
- Ultimatum game
