= Ultimatum game =

Game in economic experiments

Extensive form representation of a two proposal ultimatum game. Player 1 can offer a fair (F) or unfair (U) proposal; player 2 can accept (A) or reject (R).

The ultimatum game is a popular experimental economics game in which two players interact to decide how to divide a sum of money, first described by Nobel laureate John Harsanyi in 1961. The first player, the proposer, proposes a division of the sum with the second player, the responder. The responder can either accept the proposed division or reject it. If the responder accepts, the money is split according to the proposal; if the responder rejects, neither player receives anything. Both players know in advance the rules of the game.

The game is typically designed as a one-shot interaction to isolate immediate reactions to fairness, thereby minimizing the influence of potential future interactions. However, even within this one-shot context, participants' decision-making processes may implicitly involve considering the potential consequences of repeated interactions, due to the fact that humans have evolved within societies that interact repeatedly. This design is crucial for observing pure, unadulterated responses to the proposed division.

== Equilibrium analysis ==
For ease of exposition, the simple example illustrated above can be considered, where the proposer has two options: a fair split, or an unfair split. The argument given in this section can be extended to the more general case where the proposer can choose from many different splits.

A Nash equilibrium is a set of strategies (one for the proposer and one for the responder in this case), where no individual party can improve their reward by changing strategy. If the proposer always makes an unfair offer, the responder will do best by always accepting the offer, and the proposer will maximize their reward. Although it always benefits the responder to accept even unfair offers, the responder can adopt a strategy that rejects unfair splits often enough to induce the proposer to always make a fair offer. Any change in strategy by the proposer will lower their reward. Any change in strategy by the responder will result in the same reward or less. Thus, there are two sets of Nash equilibria for this game:

- The proposer always makes an unfair offer, and the responder always accepts an unfair offer. (The proposer never gives a fair offer so the responder can accept fair offers with any frequency without affecting the average reward.)
- The proposer always makes a fair offer. The responder rejects unfair offers often enough to make fair offers at least as profitable as unfair offers, and always accepts fair offers.

=== Finite horizon ===
In a non-repeated or finite-horizon ultimatum game, the first Nash equilibria (unfair offer, always accept) are the only that satisfy a stricter condition called subgame perfection equilibrium (SPE). The game can be viewed as having two subgames that repeat themselves: the subgame where the proposer makes a fair offer, and the subgame where the proposer makes an unfair offer. An SPE occurs when there are Nash Equilibria in every subgame, that players have no incentive to deviate from. Using backward induction, we see that in the final stage, the responder will always accept any offer. Therefore, in previous stages, the proposer will always offer the minimum amount. Thus, the responder's threat to reject unfair offers in the second Nash equilibrium is not credible in a finite setting.

=== Infinite horizon ===
However, in an infinite-horizon ultimatum game, the analysis changes significantly. Repeated interactions allow for strategies based on reputation and reciprocity. Discount factors become crucial, and the Folk Theorem suggests that many payoff distributions, including "fair" outcomes, can be supported as Nash equilibria, and potentially as subgame perfect equilibria. The one-shot deviation principle is used to verify SPE in these cases. Therefore, the conclusion that only the "unfair offer, always accept" equilibrium is SPE is specific to finite horizon games. Infinite horizon games can have many SPE.

== Multi-valued or continuous strategies ==
The simplest version of the ultimatum game has two possible strategies for the proposer, Fair and Unfair. A more realistic version would allow for many possible offers. For example, the item being shared might be a dollar bill, worth 100 cents, in which case the proposer's strategy set would be all integers between 0 and 100, inclusive for their choice of offer, S. This would have two subgame perfect equilibria: (Proposer: S=0, Accepter: Accept), which is a weak equilibrium because the acceptor would be indifferent between their two possible strategies; and the strong (Proposer: S=1, Accepter: Accept if S>=1 and Reject if S=0).

The ultimatum game is also often modelled using a continuous strategy set. Suppose the proposer chooses a share S of a pie to offer the receiver, where S can be any real number between 0 and 1, inclusive. If the receiver accepts the offer, the proposer's payoff is (1-S) and the receiver's is S. If the receiver rejects the offer, both players get zero. The unique subgame perfect equilibrium is (S=0, Accept). It is weak because the receiver's payoff is 0 whether they accept or reject. No share with S > 0 is subgame perfect, because the proposer would deviate to S' = S - $\epsilon$ for some small number $\epsilon$ and the receiver's best response would still be to accept. The weak equilibrium is an artifact of the strategy space being continuous.

== Experimental results ==
The first experimental analysis of the ultimatum game was by Werner Güth, Rolf Schmittberger, and Bernd Schwarze: Their experiments were widely imitated in a variety of settings. When carried out between members of a shared social group (e.g., a village, a tribe, a nation, humanity) people offer "fair" (i.e., 50:50) splits, and offers of less than 30% are often rejected.

Despite the outcome predicted by Nash equilibrium, numerous experimental studies have shown that people behave quite differently.

Oosterbeek et al. (2004) reviewed 37 studies and found that the first player typically offers around 40% of the "pie," although the percentage tends to decrease with larger pie sizes and when the players lack experience. Similarly, Andersen et al. (2018) observed that the rejection rate of unfair offers declines as the size of the pie being divided increases. Cooper and Dutcher (2011) reviewed a wide range of studies and found that experienced players tend to accept higher offers and reject lower ones.

=== The effect of anonymity ===
The absence of direct interaction among participants and the concealment of their identities serve to minimize the influence of social pressures. In real-world settings, however, individuals are frequently subject to both social and emotional pressures. Accordingly, it is essential to investigate the extent to which generosity and cooperation are affected by such contextual factors.

Bolton and Zwick (1995) conducted a controlled experiment using the ultimatum game, in which they systematically varied both the level of anonymity between players and the experimenter, as well as the players' capacity to impose punitive measures. Their findings indicated that increasing anonymity led to a rise in the proportion of outcomes consistent with the Nash equilibrium, from 30% to 46%. More strikingly, when the capacity to punish was eliminated, the rate of Nash-consistent outcomes increased from 30% to nearly 100%. The authors concluded that the ability to punish accounts for deviations from the Nash equilibrium to a greater extent than anonymity.

Similarly, Charness and Gneezy (2008) found that while the disclosure of recipients' surnames significantly increased generosity in the dictator game, it had no such effect in the ultimatum game. They inferred from this result that strategic motives tend to outweigh altruistic considerations in such interactions.

=== The effect of the participant origin ===
Several studies have examined the impact of participants' cultural or national origin on their level of generosity in economic decision-making games. Oosterbeek et al. (2004) found that participants from more traditional societies tended to make lower offers in the ultimatum game. Chuah et al. (2007) conducted a cross-cultural ultimatum game experiment involving Malaysian and British participants. Their results revealed that Malaysian players were more generous toward compatriots than toward British players. In contrast, the offers made by British participants were not influenced by the recipient's nationality.

=== The effect of the participants gender ===
Solnick (2001) investigated the role of gender in ultimatum game behavior. In the experiment, players were required to simultaneously decide on their offer (if they were the proposer) and the minimum amount they would accept (if they were the responder). The findings indicated that offers were influenced by the gender of the responder: when the responder was male and the proposer was female, the average offer tended to be more generous. Furthermore, both male and female responders set higher minimum acceptance thresholds when the proposer was female. García-Gallego et al. (2012) found that, although women generally exhibit greater risk aversion than men, they tended to make lower offers and were more likely to reject higher offers in the ultimatum game.

=== Fairness and genetic proximity ===
One limited study of monozygotic and dizygotic twins claims that genetic variation can have an effect on reactions to unfair offers, though the study failed to employ actual controls for environmental differences. It has also been found that delaying the responder's decision leads to people accepting "unfair" offers more often. Common chimpanzees behaved similarly to humans by proposing fair offers in one version of the ultimatum game involving direct interaction between the chimpanzees. However, another study also published in November 2012 showed that both kinds of chimpanzees (common chimpanzees and bonobos) did not reject unfair offers, using a mechanical apparatus.

=== Cross-cultural differences ===
Some studies have found significant differences between cultures in the offers most likely to be accepted and most likely to maximize the proposer's income. In one study of 15 small-scale societies, proposers in gift-giving cultures were more likely to make high offers and responders were more likely to reject high offers despite anonymity, while low offers were expected and accepted in other societies, which the authors suggested were related to the ways that giving and receiving were connected to social status in each group. Proposers and responders from WEIRD (Western, educated, industrialized, rich, democratic) societies are most likely to settle on equal splits.

=== Framing effects ===
Some studies have found significant effects of framing on game outcomes. Outcomes have been found to change based on characterizing the proposer's role as giving versus splitting versus taking, or characterizing the game as a windfall game versus a routine transaction game.

== Explanations ==
The highly mixed results, along with similar results in the dictator game, have been taken as both evidence for and against the Homo economicus assumptions of rational, utility-maximizing, individual decisions. Since an individual who rejects a positive offer is choosing to get nothing rather than something, that individual must not be acting solely to maximize their economic gain, unless one incorporates economic applications of social, psychological, and methodological factors (such as the observer effect). Several attempts have been made to explain this behavior. Some suggest that individuals are maximizing their expected utility, but money does not translate directly into expected utility. Perhaps individuals get some psychological benefit from engaging in punishment or receive some psychological harm from accepting a low offer. It could also be the case that the second player, by having the power to reject the offer, uses such power as leverage against the first player, thus motivating them to be fair.

The classical explanation of the ultimatum game as a well-formed experiment approximating general behaviour often leads to a conclusion that the rational behavior in assumption is accurate to a degree, but must encompass additional vectors of decision making. Behavioral economic and psychological accounts suggest that second players who reject offers less than 50% of the amount at stake do so for one of two reasons. An altruistic punishment account suggests that rejections occur out of altruism: people reject unfair offers to teach the first player a lesson and thereby reduce the likelihood that the player will make an unfair offer in the future. Thus, rejections are made to benefit the second player in the future, or other people in the future. By contrast, a self-control account suggests that rejections constitute a failure to inhibit a desire to punish the first player for making an unfair offer. Morewedge, Krishnamurti, and Ariely (2014) found that intoxicated participants were more likely to reject unfair offers than sober participants. As intoxication tends to exacerbate decision makers' prepotent response, this result provides support for the self-control account, rather than the altruistic punishment account. Other research from social cognitive neuroscience supports this finding.

However, several competing models suggest ways to bring the cultural preferences of the players within the optimized utility function of the players in such a way as to preserve the utility maximizing agent as a feature of microeconomics. For example, researchers have found that Mongolian proposers tend to offer even splits despite knowing that very unequal splits are almost always accepted. Similar results from other small-scale societies players have led some researchers to conclude that "reputation" is seen as more important than any economic reward. Others have proposed the social status of the responder may be part of the payoff. Another way of integrating the conclusion with utility maximization is some form of inequity aversion model (preference for fairness). Even in anonymous one-shot settings, the economic-theory suggested outcome of minimum money transfer and acceptance is rejected by over 80% of the players.

An explanation which was originally quite popular was the "learning" model, in which it was hypothesized that proposers' offers would decay towards the sub game perfect Nash equilibrium (almost zero) as they mastered the strategy of the game; this decay tends to be seen in other iterated games. However, this explanation (bounded rationality) is less commonly offered now, in light of subsequent empirical evidence.

It has been hypothesized (e.g. by James Surowiecki) that very unequal allocations are rejected only because the absolute amount of the offer is low. The concept here is that if the amount to be split were 10 million dollars, a 9:1 split would probably be accepted rather than rejecting a 1 million-dollar offer. Essentially, this explanation says that the absolute amount of the endowment is not significant enough to produce strategically optimal behaviour. However, many experiments have been performed where the amount offered was substantial: studies by Cameron and Hoffman et al. have found that higher stakes cause offers to approach closer to an even split, even in a US$100 game played in Indonesia, where average per-capita income is much lower than in the United States. Rejections are reportedly independent of the stakes at this level, with US$30 offers being turned down in Indonesia, as in the United States, even though this equates to two weeks' wages in Indonesia. However, 2011 research with stakes of up to 40 weeks' wages in India showed that "as stakes increase, rejection rates approach zero". It is worth noting that the instructions offered to proposers in this study explicitly state, "if the responder's goal is to earn as much money as possible from the experiment, they should accept any offer that gives them positive earnings, no matter how low," thus framing the game in purely monetary terms.

=== Neurological explanations ===
Generous offers in the ultimatum game (offers exceeding the minimum acceptable offer) are commonly made. Zak, Stanton & Ahmadi (2007) showed that two factors can explain generous offers: empathy and perspective taking. They varied empathy by infusing participants with intranasal oxytocin or placebo (blinded). They affected perspective-taking by asking participants to make choices as both player 1 and player 2 in the ultimatum game, with later random assignment to one of these. Oxytocin increased generous offers by 80% relative to placebo. Oxytocin did not affect the minimum acceptance threshold or offers in the dictator game (meant to measure altruism). This indicates that emotions drive generosity.

Rejections in the ultimatum game have been shown to be caused by adverse physiologic reactions to stingy offers. In a brain imaging experiment by Sanfey et al., stingy offers (relative to fair and hyperfair offers) differentially activated several brain areas, especially the anterior insular cortex, a region associated with visceral disgust. If Player 1 in the ultimatum game anticipates this response to a stingy offer, they may be more generous.

An increase in rational decisions in the game has been found among experienced Buddhist meditators. fMRI data show that meditators recruit the posterior insular cortex (associated with interoception) during unfair offers and show reduced activity in the anterior insular cortex compared to controls.

People whose serotonin levels have been artificially lowered will reject unfair offers more often than players with normal serotonin levels.

People who have ventromedial frontal cortex lesions were found to be more likely to reject unfair offers. This was suggested to be due to the abstractness and delay of the reward, rather than an increased emotional response to the unfairness of the offer.

=== Evolutionary game theory ===
Other authors have used evolutionary game theory to explain behavior in the ultimatum game. Simple evolutionary models, e.g. the replicator dynamics, cannot account for the evolution of fair proposals or for rejections. These authors have attempted to provide increasingly complex models to explain fair behavior.

== Sociological applications ==
The ultimatum game is important from a sociological perspective, because it illustrates the human unwillingness to accept injustice. The tendency to refuse small offers may also be seen as relevant to the concept of honour.

The extent to which people are willing to tolerate different distributions of the reward from "cooperative" ventures results in inequality that is, measurably, exponential across the strata of management within large corporations. See also: Inequity aversion within companies.

== History ==
An early description of the ultimatum game is by Nobel laureate John Harsanyi in 1961, who footnotes Thomas Schelling's 1960 book, The Strategy of Conflict on its solution by dominance methods. Harsanyi says,

"An important application of this principle is to ultimatum games, i.e., to bargaining games where one of the players can firmly commit himself in advance under a heavy penalty that he will insist under all conditions upon a certain specified demand (which is called his ultimatum).... Consequently, it will be rational for the first player to commit himself to his maximum demand, i.e., to the most extreme admissible demand he can make."

Josh Clark attributes modern interest in the game to Ariel Rubinstein, but the best-known article is the 1982 experimental analysis of Güth, Schmittberger, and Schwarze. Results from testing the ultimatum game challenged the traditional economic principle that consumers are rational and utility-maximising. This started a variety of research into the psychology of humans. Since the ultimatum game's development, it has become a popular economic experiment, and was said to be "quickly catching up with the Prisoner's Dilemma as a prime showpiece of apparently irrational behavior" in a paper by Martin Nowak, Karen M. Page, and Karl Sigmund.

== Variants ==
In the "competitive ultimatum game" there are many proposers and the responder can accept at most one of their offers: With more than three (naïve) proposers the responder is usually offered almost the entire endowment (which would be the Nash Equilibrium assuming no collusion among proposers).

In the "ultimatum game with tipping", a tip is allowed from responder back to proposer, a feature of the trust game, and net splits tend to be more equitable.

The "reverse ultimatum game" gives more power to the responder by giving the proposer the right to offer as many divisions of the endowment as they like. Now the game only ends when the responder accepts an offer or abandons the game, and therefore the proposer tends to receive slightly less than half of the initial endowment.

Incomplete information ultimatum games: Some authors have studied variants of the ultimatum game in which either the proposer or the responder has private information about the size of the pie to be divided. These experiments connect the ultimatum game to principal-agent problems studied in contract theory.

The pirate game illustrates a variant with more than two participants with voting power, as illustrated in Ian Stewart's "A Puzzle for Pirates".

== See also ==
- Dictator game
- Fair division experiments
- Gift-exchange game
- Impunity game
- Neuroeconomics
- Public goods game
- Prisoner's dilemma
- Social preferences
