= Dictator game =

Experimental tool

In social psychology and economics, the dictator game is a popular experimental instrument that is a derivative of the ultimatum game. It involves a single decision by the "dictator" player: given an amount of money, how much to keep and how much to send to another player. Although the "dictator" has the most power, the game has mixed results based on different behavioral attributes. The results – where most dictators choose to send money – evidence the role of fairness and norms in economic behavior, and undermine the assumption of narrow self-interest when given the opportunity to maximise one's own profits.

== Description ==
In the dictator game, one player, "the dictator", determines how to split an endowment (such as a cash prize) between themselves and a second player (the recipient). The recipient has no influence over the outcome of the game, which means the recipient plays a passive role. Those are the full rules. The dictator's action space is complete and therefore is at their own will to determine the endowment, which ranges from giving nothing to giving all the endowment.

The dictator game is a derivative of the ultimatum game, in which one player (the proposer) provides a one-time offer to the other (the responder). In the ultimatum game, the responder can choose to either accept or reject the proposer's bid, but rejecting the bid would result in both players receiving a payoff of 0. While the ultimatum game is informative, it can be considered an over simplified model when discussing most real-world negotiation situations. Real-world games tend to involve offers and counteroffers while the ultimatum game is simply player one placing forward a division of an amount that player 2 has to accept or reject. Based on this limited scope, it is expected that the second player will accept any offer they are given, which is not necessarily seen in real world examples.

== Application ==
The initial game was developed by Daniel Kahneman in the 1980s and involved three parties, with one active and two passive participants. However, it was only in 1994 that a paper by Forsythe et al. simplified this to the contemporary form of this game with one decision-maker (the dictator) and one passive participant (the recipient). One would expect players to behave "rationally" and maximize their own payoffs, as shown by the homo economicus principle; however, it has been shown that human populations are more "benevolent than homo economicus" and therefore rarely do the majority give nothing to the recipient.

In the original dictator game, the dictator and the recipient were randomly selected and completely unknown. However it was found that the result was different depending on the social distance between the two parties. The level of "social distance" that a dictator and a recipient have changes the ratio of endowment that the dictator is willing to give. If the dictator in the game has anonymity with the recipient, resulting in a high level of social distance, they are most likely to give less endowment, whereas players with a low level of social distance, whether they are very familiar with each other or shallowly acquainted, are more likely to give a higher proportion of the endowment to the recipient.

When players are within an organization, they are likely to have a low level of social distance. Within organizations, altruism and prosocial behavior are heavily relied on in dictator games for optimal organizational output. Prosocial behavior encourages the "intention of promoting the welfare of the individual, group, or organization toward which it is directed".

== Experiments ==
In 1988, a group of researchers at the University of Iowa conducted a controlled experiment to evaluate the homo economicus model of behavior with groups of voluntarily recruited economics, accounting, and business students. These experimental results contradict the homo economicus model, suggesting that players in the dictator role take fairness and potential adverse consequences into account when making decisions about how much utility to give the recipient. A later study in neuroscience further challenged the homo economicus model, suggesting that various cognitive differences among humans affect decision-making processes, and thus ideas of fairness.

Experimental results have indicated that adults often allocate money to the recipients, reducing the amount of money the dictator receives. These results appear robust: for example, Henrich et al. discovered in a wide cross-cultural study that dictators allocate a non-zero share of the endowment to the recipient. In modified versions of the dictator game, children also tend to allocate some of a resource to a recipient and most five-year-olds share at least half of their goods.

A number of studies have examined psychological framing of the dictator game with a version called "taking" in which the player "takes" resources from the recipient's predetermined endowment, rather than choosing the amount to "give". Some studies show no effect between male and female players, but one 2017 study reported a difference between male and female players in the taking frame, with females allocating significantly more to the recipient under the "taking" frame compared to the "giving" frame, while males showed exactly the opposite behavior – nullifying the overall effect.

In 2016, Bhogal et al. conducted a study to evaluate the effects of perceived attractiveness on decision-making behavior and altruism in the standard dictator game, testing theories that altruism may serve as a courtship display. This study found no relationship between attractiveness and altruism.

If these experiments appropriately reflect individuals' preferences outside of the laboratory, these results appear to demonstrate that either:

1. Dictators' utility functions include only money that they receive and dictators fail to maximize it.
2. Dictators' utility functions may include non-tangible harms they incur (for example self-image or anticipated negative views of others in society), or
3. Dictators' utility functions may include benefits received by others.

Additional experiments have shown that subjects maintain a high degree of consistency across multiple versions of the dictator game in which the cost of giving varies. This suggests that dictator game behavior is well approximated by a model in which dictators maximize utility functions that include benefits received by others, that is, subjects are increasing their utility when they pass money to the recipients. The latter implies they are maximizing a utility function that incorporates the recipient's welfare and not only their own welfare. This is the core of the "other-regarding" preferences. A number of experiments have shown that donations are substantially larger when the dictators are aware of the recipient's need of the money. Other experiments have shown a relationship between political participation, social integration, and dictator game giving, suggesting that it may be an externally valid indicator of concern for the well-being of others. Regarding altruism, recent papers have shown that experimental subjects in a lab environment do not behave differently to other participants in an outside setting. Studies have suggested that behavior in this game is heritable.

== Challenges ==
The idea that the highly mixed results of the dictator game prove or disprove rationality in economics is not widely accepted. Results offer both support of the classical assumptions and notable exceptions which have led to improved holistic economic models of behavior. Some authors have suggested that giving in the dictator game does not entail that individuals wish to maximize others' benefit (altruism). Instead they suggest that individuals have some negative utility associated with being seen as greedy, and are avoiding this judgment by the experimenter. Some experiments have been performed to test this hypothesis with mixed results.

Additionally, the mixed results of the dictator game point to other behavioral attributes that may influence how individuals play the game. Specifically, people are motivated by altruism and how their actions are perceived by others, rather than solely by avoiding being viewed as greedy. There have been experiments that more deeply study people's motivations in this game. One experiment showed that females are more likely to value altruism in their actions than males. They are also more likely to be more altruistic towards other females than to males. This proves that there are many extraneous variables that may influence players' decisions in the dictator game, such as an individual's own motivations and the other players.

== Variants ==
The Trust Game is similar to the dictator game, but with an added first step. It is a sequential game involving two players, the trustor and the trustee. Initially called the Investment Game by Berg, Dickhaut and McCabe in 1995, the trust game originated as a design experiment to study trust and reciprocity in an investment setting. In the trust game, the trustor first decides how much of an endowment to give to the trustee. The trustor is also informed that whatever they send will be tripled by the experimenter. Then the trustee (now acting as a dictator) decides how much of this increased endowment to allocate to the trustor. Thus the dictator's (or trustee's) partner must decide how much of the initial endowment to trust with the dictator (in the hopes of receiving the same amount or more in return). In this game, it is all about trust and trustworthiness in order to determine the behavior of the two players. Since trust is an important factor in economic behavior, trust and trustworthiness must be addressed at an individual level by utilizing experimental designs involving both roles in different trust games. The experiments rarely end in the subgame perfect Nash equilibrium of "no trust". Often, studies found that having more trust resulted in the participant losing more in the end. Since the decision to trust is dependent on the belief that the other participant will reciprocate, according to Berg et al.'s study, then the first participant will usually send an endowment even when they are not expecting anything back, similar to the practical conditions of participating in the lottery. This is because the trustor wants to avoid the responsibility of leaving the trustee with no endowment and risking zero payoffs at the end of the game. A pair of studies published in 2008 of identical and fraternal twins in the US and Sweden suggests that behavior in this game is heritable. Later research introduced variants of the trust game that allow players to gather information about a partner's past behavior before deciding whether to trust them; one study found that people acquire less information when their inquiries are visible to the partner, indicating that impression-management concerns can constrain information gathering in trust decisions.

Betrayal aversion is another major factor that weighs the impact of trust and risk, determining whether trusting another person is equivalent to taking a risky bet. Initially coined by Bohnet and Zeckhauser, betrayal aversion could prevent the trustor from not trusting the trustee due to the social risk of having zero payoffs. Their study looked at a practical experiment where participants were randomly paired with one another to increase the probability that the outcome would be dependent on the actions of the trustee selected. Results from the study showed that regardless of whether the trustor placed a safe or risky bet, the payoffs were not equivalent to the trustee's payoffs. Ultimately, Bohnet and Zeckhauser assessed potential risk with the Trust Game and the relative hesitation made by each participant when deciding the amount to give in the game.

A variation of the dictator game called the "taking" game (see "Experiments" section above for further detail) emerged from sociological experiments conducted in 2003, in which the dictator decides how much utility to "take" from the recipient's pre-determined endowment. This dictator game variation was designed to evaluate the idea of greed, rather than the idea of fairness or altruism generally evaluated with the standard dictator game model, also referred to as the "giving" game.

== Fairness and moral behavior ==
To examine whether giving in dictator games stems from sense of fairness, Andreoni and Bernheim (2009) conducted an experiment in which participants were given $20 to distribute. In some cases, the dictator's decision was not implemented, and instead, the recipient received either $0 or, in an alternative treatment, $1. As part of the experiment, the recipients and the dictators were publicly identified, and the final allocation was announced at the end of the study. The experiment results suggest that as the probability of the dictator's decision being overridden increased, so did the likelihood that the dictator would offer $0. In contrast, the probability of choosing an equal split decreased. Furthermore, increasing the fallback payment from $0 to $1 when the dictator's decision was not implemented led to a decline in the likelihood of offering $1 while increasing the likelihood of selecting the equal split. The authors concluded that people are generous to a certain extent and do take consideration at their public image.

Snir (2014) further explored these dynamics by allowing dictators to determine the probability of selecting each of three possible allocations of €12 between themselves and a recipient:

- Option A: The dictator received €12, and the recipient received €0.
- Option B: The dictator received €9, and the recipient received €3.
- Option C: Both the dictator and recipient received €6 each.

The findings indicate that, on average, dictators chose the selfish allocation (Option A) 70% of the time, regardless of whether the recipients were only aware of the outcomes or also knew the probabilities.

== The effect of the sum available for distribution ==
Forsythe et al. (1994) found that doubling the available sum from $5 to $10 did not change the proportion of the "pie" the dictator allocated to the recipient.

Similarly, Carpenter et al. (2005) observed that increasing the sum from $10 to $100 did not affect the relative share given by the dictator.

However, List and Cherry (2008) found that increasing the sum from $10 to $100 led to an increase in donations, but by less than the proportional increase in the total amount.

Engel (2011) conducted a meta-analysis and concluded that as the available sum increased, dictators tended to keep a larger proportion for themselves.

Expanding the dictator's range of choices also influenced behavior. List (2007) and Bardsley (2008) allowed dictators to not only give money but also take money from the recipient. This led to decreased generosity, although only a few participants opted for full selfishness. Nonetheless, some chose to take money from the recipient.

== The effect of anonymity ==
Dufwenberg and Muren (2006) examined how anonymity affects giving by conducting two versions of the dictator game:

1. In one version, dictators sat next to each other and publicly circled the amount they chose to give. Payments were also made in front of everyone.
2. In another version, the decision was made in a private room.

The results showed that public payments decreased the average level of giving.

Similarly, Charness and Gneezy (2008) compared a completely anonymous dictator game (where neither party knew each other's identity) to one where each dictator knew the recipient's last name. Removing full anonymity increased giving from 18.3% to 27.2%. Bechler et al. (2015) found that this effect persisted even when the available sum was increased.

Goeree et al. (2010) conducted a study mapping students' social networks in a California high school. He finds that the closer the social ties between the dictator and the recipient, the higher the level of giving.

Andreoni and Rao (2011) found that giving increased significantly when the recipient could directly ask the dictator for a donation. Engel's (2011) meta-analysis of 20,813 observations showed that familiarity increased giving by an average of 0.658 percentage points.

To control for the possibility that participants might give more out of shame in front of the experimenter, Hoffman et al. (1994) conducted an experiment where even the experimenter did not know who the dictator was and who the recipient was. In this setup, the number of participants choosing to keep all the money significantly increased. In a follow-up study (Hoffman et al., 1996), the researchers manipulated anonymity levels and found that giving decreased as anonymity increased.

== The effect of messages and subtle cue ==
Brañas-Garza (2007) conducted a dictator game where participants received an instructional note stating: "Remember, the decision is yours." This subtle message significantly increased giving.

Burnham (2003) found that showing participants a picture of the recipient did not affect the number of people who chose to give $0, but those who did give ended up donating more.

Rigdon et al. (2009) tested the impact of subtle visual cues by presenting two different images to participants:

1. A neutral arrangement of three dots.
2. Three dots arranged to resemble a pair of watching eyes.

Dictators exposed to the eye-like pattern gave more, with a particularly strong effect on male participants. This suggests that even minimal social cues can influence generosity.

== The effect of the way the money was obtained ==
The dictator game examines how much an individual is willing to give to another person. However, giving behavior is influenced by how the dictator obtained their money.

Hoffman et al. (1994) assigned dictator roles based on performance in a test, and Cherry et al. (2002) linked the amount available for allocation to test performance. In both cases, dictators gave less when they felt they had earned their money.

Oxoby and Spraggon (2008) further found that when the recipient had to earn the sum available for distribution, dictators were more generous, sometimes even giving more than 50%. These results suggest that perceptions of fairness depend on whether wealth was acquired by luck or effort. When money is earned through personal effort, people feel less obligated to share it. However, if the money is obtained by chance, the expectation of fairness increases.

== See also ==
- Impunity game
- Neuroeconomics
- Ultimatum game
- Prisoner's dilemma
- Public goods game
- Social preferences
