= Czexpats in Science =

Czech science organisation

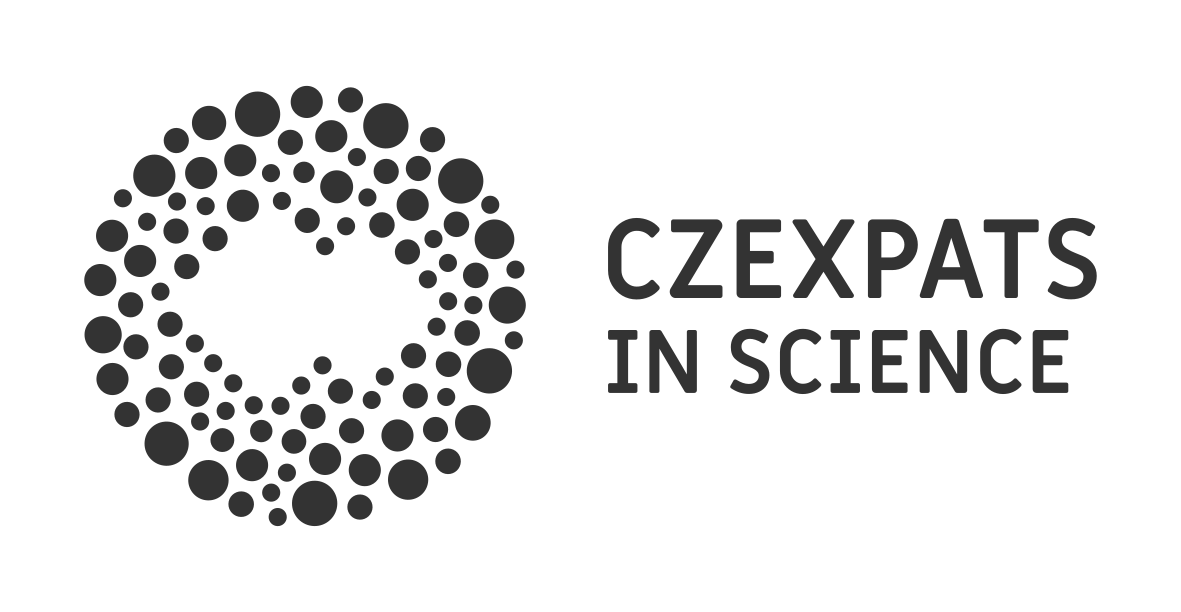
- Volunteers: 10

Czexpats in Science is an organization founded in 2018 with the aim of connecting Czech scientists who are currently working overseas and those who have come back to the Czech Republic after gaining experience abroad.

== Objectives and activity ==
The initiative's core mission is to foster connections among Czech scientists overseas, facilitate information sharing, and aid the return of Czech scientists to their homeland. The organization's activities encompass both online and offline aspects.

Online activities are primarily centred around the Map of Scientists project, which highlights the workplaces of 290 Czech scientists across 37 countries worldwide (as of March 2020). Additionally, the organization produces blogs detailing individual researchers' experiences abroad and short articles aimed at popularizing the achievements of Czech scientists overseas.

Offline activities include the annual pre-Christmas gathering of scientists in the Czech Republic, local meetings of Czech researchers in various countries, and the organization of workshops aimed at supporting Czech students' international journeys.

== Support and cooperation ==
The association is supported from various sources, including the Experientia Foundation, the Neuron Foundation for the Support of Science, as well as contributions from private companies and crowdfunding via darujme.cz. Collaboratively, the association partners with several Czech universities, the information portal vedavyzkum.cz, and the magazine Vesmír.

Furthermore, the association plays a pivotal role in policy development, collaborating with institutions such as the Senate and the Ministry of Foreign Affairs to shape expatriate policies. It also actively participated in the National Round Table on Science Policy in May 2019. and participated in the National Round Table on Science Policy in May 2019.

== European context ==
In Central and Eastern European countries, the issue of a brain drain, including scientists, is a significant concern. This phenomenon has been exacerbated, especially after the V4 states joined the Schengen area. Similar initiatives are emerging in neighboring countries to address this challenge. For instance, in Poland, there's the Polonium Foundation, and in Slovakia, the Žijemvedu civic association. These organizations share the common goal of shifting the trend from a one-way flow of human capital out of the country to a more circular movement, encouraging scientists to return to their homeland or enabling those abroad to contribute positively to their home country's scientific landscape, even from a distance.

== See also ==
- Intellectual inbreeding
- Bologna Process
- Diaspora
- Emigration
