= History of agriculture in China =

For millennia, agriculture has played an important role in the Chinese economy and society. By the time the People's Republic of China was established in 1949, virtually all arable land was under cultivation; irrigation and drainage systems constructed centuries earlier and intensive farming practices already produced relatively high yields. But little prime virgin land was available to support population growth and economic development. However, after a decline in production as a result of the Great Leap Forward (1958–60), agricultural reforms implemented in the 1980s increased yields and promised even greater future production from existing cultivated land.

== Ancient history ==
Wheat entered cultivation in the lower Yellow River valley c. 2600 BC, followed by Gansu and Xinjiang (c. 1900 BC. By 1600 BC, wheat cultivation had spread to Tibet and the middle Yellow River valley.

== Song dynasty, 960-1279 ==
The Song dynasty period was a time of major growth in commercialized agriculture, as well as economic growth more generally."

== Ming dynasty, 1368–1644 ==
The population doubled as new lands were settled in Fujian, Guangzhou, and Guangxi provinces, new crops were introduced, and irrigation systems were improved. The mountainous areas in southeastern China were developed in the Ming-Qing period by migrants from overcrowded areas. They specialized in crops such as corn and tea, the latter having rapidly increasing demand in foreign markets.

It is certainly true that Chinese expertise in agriculture, as in many other branches of knowledge, still rivalled and surpassed anything known in the West when the Jesuits arrived at the Ming court. Early visitors marvelled at the high productivity of Chinese farming, its ingenious crop rotations, sophisticated water-raising devices and other equipment, and the rationality and industry of the Chinese peasant farmer. They were also struck by the predominant position accorded to agriculture in the Chinese political economy, where it was known as 'the fundamental' (pen). This was a crucial influence on the theories of the French school of political economists, the Physiocrats, who like the Chinese philosophers insisted that agriculture, rather than commerce or industry, was the only source of true and enduring wealth.

— Francesca Bray

Beginning in the 1500s, Chinese farmers cleared land in the highlands to cultivate New World crops including maize and sweet potatoes. Centuries of these practices contributed to deforestation, erosion that worsened flooding and clogged waterways with sediment, and other environmental degradation.

== Qing dynasty, 1644–1911 ==
In the pre 1949 era 90% of the population lived by agriculture, from poor tenant farmers to rich landlords. Many were very poor tenants or day laborers; others especially in the southern provinces were better off and more secure by owning their land. Confucians who controlled China praised agriculturalists as honest men who provided the nation's food.

Famines and floods were serious risks. China generally experienced regional famines every few years beginning at least in the early 1800s. To forestall local rebellions the Qing government established an elaborate system to protect against famines and other disasters such as epidemics. It was built around a granary system that stored grain. It minimized famine distress by distributing free or low-cost grain. However the system was largely destroyed during the Taiping Rebellion of the 1850s, putting this large element of population at risk from flooding, droughts, pestilence, and other causes of famines. The introduction of a major new food supply in sweet potatoes sharply reduced the excess hunger and reduced the frequency of revolts.

After suppressing rebellions in the 1860s, the national government worked to relieve distress, stabilize society and improve farming. It reduced taxes and required corvée labor, reclaimed land, and promoting irrigation. During much of the 19th century, land tax was low and famine relief efforts were highly effective. There were millions of deaths in the late 1870s, resulting from factors including Qing borrowing for wars against Muslims in Gansu and Xinjiang, corruption, and indemnity payments to Western countries following the First Opium War and Second Opium War further affecting the availability of wheat and rice reserves. After 1900 the government set up rural associations that published newspapers and instructional pamphlets for farmers, set up agricultural schools, held local training sessions, as well as agricultural exhibitions. Programs to continue water conservation and forest station projects continued. The reforms in agriculture were one dimension of a vigorous last-minute effort by the Qing government to rapidly reform education, the military, and local administration.

During the 1800s and 1900s, intensive farming systems in China caused the progressive loss of soil nutrients like nitrogen and phosphorus.

Republican-era China generally continued to experience regional famines every few years.

== Since 1949 ==
Following the success of Land Reform, at the founding of the PRC in 1949, China could credibly claim that for the first time since the late Qing period that it had succeeded in feeding one fifth of the world's population with only 7% of the world's cultivable land. The 1949 Common Program stated that "the People's Government should organize peasants and all labor power that can carry out agricultural work to ... [develop] agricultural production ... Every step of land reform should be integrated with the revival and development of agricultural production." It addressed the need to raise agricultural yields through developing new crop varieties, fertilizer use, land reclamation, agricultural migration, and the repair and construction of waterworks.

At the time of the founding of the PRC, at least 80% of its people were subsistence farmers.

During the late 1940s, a collectivization effort began in the areas controlled by the Communist Party, with land being confiscated from landlords and redistributed to its former tenants. These efforts led to three operational systems of collectivization as the plans progressed, and initial successes indicated future potential returns. These systems were mutual aid teams, consisting of just a few families working the same land together, pooling their animals, tools, and labour to maximize the use of their land. Then there was the elementary cooperative, with between 20 and 30 families combining their assets and working in an area much larger than the smaller mutual aid teams. However, despite this pooling of resources, the land, tools, and animals were still privately owned by the various member houses and they were paid either through dividend payments for land or work materials, or remuneration for their work. The third and final type, the collective farm or advanced cooperative, differed from the other two models. Where in the first two systems there remained some level of private ownership of tools and produce, and a more capitalist payment structure for peasants, the advanced cooperative had all means of production collectivized and a radically different income stream for peasant farmers compared to the other two, with income instead being dependent on work points calculated by participation and shifting away from any form of private enterprise. The propagation of these models began slowly, with only 500 advanced cooperatives established by the summer of 1955 but successes of the model between 1952 and 1958 in increasing agricultural production by 27.8%, while the population grew by only 14.8%, drove collectivization further in a fervour known as the Socialist High Tide that occurred between 1955 and 1956. This resulted in the disappearance, by and large, of the mutual aid team by 1958 and radical draw-downs in elementary cooperatives in favour of advanced cooperatives and a broadening of collectivized farming such that by the end of 1957, there were now 753,000 advanced cooperatives containing 119 million households.

In the 1950s, programs encouraged young people to extend new agricultural technology and methods in rural China.

During China's First Five-Year Plan period (1953-1957), agriculture, including water conservancy, accounted for only 4% of the government's investment budget. Leading into the Great Leap Forward, China experienced a population boom that strained its food supply, despite rising agricultural yields. Increased yields could not keep pace with a population that benefitted from a major decrease in mortality (due to successful public health campaigns and the end of war) and a high fertility rate. Continued increases in food production would depend on additional agricultural infrastructure.

China's development policy modernized agricultural production during the first 20 years of the commune system. Agricultural science and technology likewise progressed significantly during collective production.

Over the period 1957 to 1979:

- The amount of machine-cultivated land grew from 2.4% to 42.4%
- Irrigated land area grew from 24.45% to 45.2%
- Land irrigated with the help of electricity grew (as a percentage of all irrigated land) from 4.4% to 56.3%
- The number of small and medium sized tractors in use increased by a factor of 45
- Horsepower per hectare of major agricultural machinery (irrigation or drainage equipment, tractors, and tillers) grew at an annual rate of 24%

China's grain production increased from between 163.9 and 181 million tons in 1952 to 285 million tons in 1977. Generally, grain production increased 3% annually, except for the period 1959-1961. During this period, grain output dropped from 200 million tons through the end of 1958 to a low of 147.5 million tons in 1961, and not fully recovering to pre-collapse production numbers until 1966. Improved varieties of grain helped raise yields during this period.

Collectivization was a factor in the most important change in Chinese agriculture, the dramatic increase in irrigated land during the early and mid-1950s. Collectivization also helped facilitate the labor-intensive practice of double-cropping in southern China, which greatly increased agricultural yields.

After the failure of the Great Leap Forward, China radically increased its use of chemical fertilizers.

By 1965, a plastic film (dimo) was in use in every Chinese province to lengthen growing seasons and reduce the need for irrigation water. Dimo is rolled out newly-planted seeds to preserve moisture and warmth, which enables the planting season to begin earlier.

In 1965, the State Council began the "agricultural scientific experiment movement," which further developed various local agricultural practices. One of the highlighted practices was the "three-in-one" system in which farmers, cadres, and technicians worked together to increase agricultural outputs.

From the late 1960s to the early 1970s, various rural localities created "four-level agricultural scientific experiment networks". These networks connected scientific institutes and units across various levels of government to promote the spread of new policies, technology, and successful local experiments. By 1974, the Chinese Academy of Science and the Ministry of Agriculture and Forestry were working to further develop these networks.

In 1970, rice and other crops in Zhejiang were found to be contaminated by organic mercury compounds from chemical pesticides. A provincial ban resulted, with a national ban following in 1973. China banned DDT and BHC in 1983.

In 1973, Chinese scientists developed high-yield hybrid rice and the country rapidly developed seed production and distribution systems to distribute new generations of seeds to millions of rural people.

Academic Peter Ho writes that during the 1960s and 1970s, the effort to increase grain production through expanded agricultural acreage coincided with more conservation-focused mechanisms of rural development "in which animal husbandry, forestry, and agriculture were balanced out according to local conditions.

During the 1970s, the use of synthetic fertilizer rapidly increased.

By the late 1970s, years of China's "normal socialist agriculture" resulted in an increase in per capita staple crop production and had remedied most of the short-term ecological damage that had occurred during the Great Leap Forward.

After more than twenty-five years of experience with communes, officials abolished these institutions, which they perceived as too bureaucratic and rigid to respond to the flexible requirements of agricultural production. Also, farm production incentives languished in the commune system. In 1978 China's leaders began a program of far-reaching agricultural reforms. These reforms, conducted under Deng Xiaoping, reorganized collective agriculture such that individual households gained considerable autonomy, and greatly enlarged the private agricultural sector. Townships and villages were organized, and new incentives were incorporated into contractual relationships tying farmers to economic cooperatives and businesses. By the end of the 1970s, China had achieved self-sufficiency in food. China reached a record high for domestic agricultural production in 1984. Although China's agricultural success is often attributed to the rural reforms of the 1980s, academic Hou Li contends that the advances during the 1960s and 1970s deserve more credit than they are often given.

== Reform of the agricultural economy in the 1980s ==
The household responsibility system replaced collective farming. This system became national policy in 1983, but had previously been the subject of local experimentation in Anhui and Sichuan provinces, where agricultural production had lagged. In this system, households contributed to state quotas but could also make their own decisions about what to plant on contracted land and could sell via a multi-tier price system that included the lowest price for payment to the state up until the quota, a higher rate for above-quota sales to the state, and market price for crops allowed to be sold at fairs. This was enabled by three policy changes: (1) the state increased the price it paid to purchase staple crops, as well as some other agricultural products, (2) the state reduced the number of agricultural products which were subject to state monopsony and monopoly, and (3) the state reestablished rural markets for produce and other commodities. By 1985, each household responsibility system contract specified a quota output to sell to the government, with the rest of the output capable of being consumed or sold on the market. Agricultural production increased under the household responsibility system, which in Chinese Marxist discourse was described as liberating the productive forces.

In the late 1980s, China remained a predominantly agricultural country. As of 1985 about 63% [percent] of the population lived in rural areas, and nearly 63 percent of the national labor force was engaged in agriculture (see Migration in China). Modern technology had spread slowly in the vast farm areas, and the availability of modern supplies was less than adequate, causing growth in agricultural output to lag behind production increases in the rest of the economy. The proportion of GNP produced by agriculture declined from over 43 percent in the early 1950s to about 29 percent in 1985. The low agricultural growth rate as compared with other sectors of the economy reflected the fact that the average farmer had far less machinery and electric power and fewer other modern production aids to work with than the average worker in industry. Under the responsibility system, farm households and collective organizations purchased large amounts of new machinery, particularly small tractors and trucks. The power of agricultural machinery per farmer increased by almost 30 percent between 1979 and 1985 but still came to less than 1 horsepower (0.75 kW) per person.

Before the early 1980s, most of the agricultural sector was organized according to the three-tier commune system (see Rural society in the People's Republic of China). There were over 50,000 people's communes, most containing around 30,000 members. Each commune was made up of about sixteen production brigades, and each production brigade was composed of around seven production teams. The production teams were the basic agricultural collective units. They corresponded to small villages and typically included about 30 households and 100 to 250 members. The communes, brigades, and teams owned all major rural productive assets and provided nearly all administrative, social, and commercial services in the countryside. The largest part of farm family incomes consisted of shares of net team income, distributed to members according to the amount of work each had contributed to the collective effort. Farm families also worked small private plots and were free to sell or consume their products.

By the end of 1984, approximately 98 percent of the old production teams had adopted the contract responsibility system, and all but 249 communes had been dissolved, their governmental functions passed on to 91,000 township and town governments. Production team organizations were replaced by 940,000 village committees. Under this system, public ownership of land and some of the means of production was maintained, but production was made the responsibility of households. Households still had to contribute to state quotas but could make their own decisions about what to plant on contracted land and could sell via a multi-tier price system that included the lowest price for payment to the state up until the quota, a higher rate for above-quota sales to the state, and market price for crops allowed to be sold at fairs. This system had the effect of both incentivizing production, while stabilizing prices to protect households from the drop in market prices caused by the boom in agricultural production.

Market activity played a central role in the rural economy of the 1980s. Farmers sold a growing share of their produce in rural or urban free markets and purchased many of the inputs that had formerly been supplied by the team or brigade. A prominent new institution that thrived in the market environment was the "specialized household." Specialized households operated in the classic pattern of the entrepreneur, buying or renting equipment to produce a good or service that was in short supply locally. Some of the most common specialties were trucking, chicken raising, pig raising, and technical agricultural services, such as irrigation and pest control. Many of the specialized households became quite wealthy relative to the average farmer.

The new economic climate and the relaxation of restrictions on the movements of rural residents gave rise to numerous opportunities for profit-making ventures in the countryside. Towns, villages, and groups of households referred to as "rural economic unions" established small factories, processing operations, construction teams, catering services, and other kinds of nonagricultural concerns. Many of these organizations had links with urban enterprises that found the services of these rural units to be less expensive and more efficient than those of their formal urban counterparts.

The growth of these nonagricultural enterprises in the countryside created a large number of new jobs, making it possible for many workers who were no longer needed in agriculture to "leave the land but stay in the country," significantly changing the structure of the rural economy and increasing rural incomes. In 1986 nonagricultural enterprises in the countryside employed 21 percent of the rural labor force and for the first time produced over half the value of rural output.

Although the chief characteristic of the new rural system was household farming for profit, collective organizations still played a major role. Agricultural land still was owned by township or town governments, which determined the crops farmers contracted to grow and the financial terms of the contracts. Many township, town, and village governments also engaged in major entrepreneurial undertakings, establishing factories, processing mills, brick works, and other large-scale enterprises. Finally, the maintenance and operation of public works, such as irrigation systems, power plants, schools, and clinics, generally still was regarded as the responsibility of the collective administrations.

Four percent of the nation's farmland was cultivated by state farms, which employed 4.9 million people in 1985. State farms were owned and operated by the government much in the same way as an industrial enterprise. Management was the responsibility of a director, and workers were paid set wages, although some elements of the responsibility system were introduced in the mid-1980s. State farms were scattered throughout China, but the largest numbers were located in frontier or remote areas, including Xinjiang in the northwest, Inner Mongolia, the three northeastern provinces of Heilongjiang, Jilin, and Liaoning and the southeastern provinces of Guangdong, Fujian, and Jiangxi.

== 1990s and later ==
From the 1980s to 1998, food production and consumption continued to grow, both overall and per capita. After adoption of the socialist market economy, agricultural production increased significantly and China eliminated starvation. Production of nearly every agricultural product continued to grow afterwards, although rates of growth slowed somewhat after 2000.

To address concern about China's urbanization reducing farmland, the government put into effect the Basic Farmland Regulations in 1994. In 1999, the New Land Administration Law was passed. These mandated that county-level governments and higher designate areas in every township or village where farmland would be protected from residential or industrial development.

The Ministry of Agriculture and Rural Affairs stated in late 2020 that it would designate 6.6 million hectares of prime agricultural land as grain zones to be farmed with high production methods and which could not be converted to other crops. It also raised subsidies for rice, corn, and soybean growing.

As of at least 2022, China produces almost all of its own food and non-soybean livestock feed. Food security nonetheless remained a prominent concern as in 2022 China experienced its worst drought since the 1949 establishment of the People's Republic of China.

As of 2023, approximately 40% of China's workforce is engaged in farming, primarily at small scale. Agricultural production accounts for less than 9% of China's GDP.

== Resources endowment ==
Arable land in China was particularly scarce; little more than 10 percent of the total land area, most of it in the eastern third of the country, can be cultivated. This compares with more than 20 percent for the continental United States, which is around the same size as China, despite having one billion fewer people. Further agricultural expansion was relatively difficult because almost no land that could be profitably cultivated remained unused and because, despite intensive cultivation, yields from some marginal lands were low. Some possibility for expansion existed in thinly populated parts of the country, especially in the northeast, but the growing season there was short and the process of land reclamation prolonged and costly.

China Proper is divided by the Qinling range into highly dissimilar north and south agricultural areas. In semitropical south China, rainfall is relatively abundant and the growing season long. Rice has been the predominant grain crop. The paddies can generally be irrigated with water from rivers or other sources. Although much of the soil is acid red clay, the heavy use of fertilizer (at one time organic but by the mid-1980s also including a large proportion of chemical nutrients) supports high yields. Frequently two or even three crops a year are cultivated on the same land. Food crops other than rice are also grown, most frequently in hilly areas or during the winter. These include potatoes and winter wheat. The highest grain yields in the country in the mid-1980s were generally found in the Sichuan Basin, the lower Yangtze River Valley, and Guangdong and Fujian provinces, where multiple cropping of rice and other crops was the typical pattern. Cotton, tea, and industrial crops were also produced there.

Wheat has traditionally been the main crop in north China, a considerably drier region than south China. The winter wheat crop accounts for nearly 90 percent of China's total production. Spring wheat is grown mainly in the eastern portion of Inner Mongolia and the northeastern provinces. Other important grain crops include corn, sorghum, and millet. These are usually dryland crops. Since the late 1960s, irrigation has been greatly expanded, but water remains an important limiting factor. Compared with the south, soils in the north are generally better; however, because of the shorter growing season and colder, drier climate, yields per cultivated hectare tend to be lower and irrigation less extensive. Labor is not as abundant in the north as in the south, but cropping patterns tend to require less labor, and mechanization (especially of plowing) is more advanced.

The North China Plain, the most important growing area in north China, extends across several provinces. Winter wheat and corn are the leading grain crops; cotton is also grown, and Shandong produces peanuts. The North China Plain, although fertile, was traditionally subject to frequent floods and droughts, but water conservation measures ameliorated the problem. Winter wheat is grown in the mountainous areas west of this plain, but the climate is more severe and the danger of natural disasters even greater. The fertile soils of the northeastern plains have been used to plant corn, spring wheat, and even rice. High-quality soybeans are grown in the northeast and are exported to many Pacific Rim countries. Although Inner Mongolia produces some spring wheat and other grain, it is best known as a pastoral area.

Much of China's vast and generally inhospitable northwest and southwest regions is unsuitable for cultivation. Xinjiang in the northwest, like Inner Mongolia, is also best known as a pastoral area. In Tibet Autonomous Region (Xizang) in the southwest, most of the cultivated area has been irrigated, and special strains of wheat, rice, and barley suitable for the climate of that high-altitude region have been developed.

China's rural labor force in 1985 consisted of about 370 million people. The quality of the labor force had improved in the previous three decades, primarily because of the introduction of rural schools, which stressed elementary education. Nevertheless, a large portion of the rural population was illiterate or semiliterate in 1987, and very few high school and college graduates lived in villages and towns. Lack of education continued to retard the spread of advanced technology in rural areas. The scarcity of cultivable land and the abundance of manpower led to the development of labor-intensive production in most parts of the country. And, although China's agriculture was less labor-intensive than that in some neighboring countries, it was characterized by meticulous tending of the land and other techniques employed in East Asia for centuries.

In the 1980s the rural labor force also was employed in rural capital construction projects and small-scale industries. During the winter months, large numbers of rural people worked on construction and maintenance of irrigation or land-leveling projects. Where rural industrial plants existed, they usually employed a small proportion of the rural labor force, and many peasants also engaged in sideline activities, such as handicrafts. The government tightly limited migration from rural to urban areas (see Migration in China).

By the 1980s China had improved its agricultural resources, but important obstacles remained. The country's agricultural capital stock had been built up in large part by land modification. Through the centuries fields were leveled and consolidated, and substantial investments were made in building and modernizing irrigation facilities. Since the 1950s the production of mechanical agricultural equipment had been a major industry. But in the 1980s many observers still noted a shortage of transportation facilities to take crops to market and bring seed, fuel, and fertilizer to users (see Transport in the People's Republic of China). In addition to capital, China had available a supply of skilled labor and a stock of technical information on seed varieties and fertilizer use despite the damage done by the Cultural Revolution (1966–76).

== Agricultural policies ==
Agricultural policy has gone through three broad phases: the 1950s, when agriculture was collectivized, ending with the Great Leap Forward (1958–60); the period from 1961 to the death of Mao Zedong in 1976, when more agricultural progress came to depend on the supply of capital and modern inputs; and the period under the post-Mao leadership, which has been characterized by greater reliance on markets, prices, and incentives to boost production and to diversify output. (Inputs in this case refer to components of production such as land, labor, seed, fertilizer, machinery, tools, and irrigation water.)

=== The 1950s ===
During the 1950s the government of the new People's Republic made a concerted effort to redistribute land more equitably. Although many peasants owned part or all of the small holdings they farmed before 1949, tenancy was common, especially in south China. The Chinese Communist Party (CCP) implemented land reforms in areas under its control even before 1949, and subsequently landlords and wealthy peasants became targets of party attack. Their elimination as a class was a major aim of the land reform movement begun under the Agrarian Reform Law of June 28, 1950. Collectivization of agriculture, which was accomplished in several stages, began about 1952.

The first stage of land reform was characterized by mutual aid teams. The mutual aid system was kept simple at first, involving only the temporary sharing of labor and some capital; individual households remained the basic unit of ownership and production. In 1954 mutual aid teams were organized with increasing rapidity into agricultural producers' cooperatives, which differed from mutual aid teams in that tools, draft animals, and labor were shared on a permanent basis. Cooperative members retained ownership of their land but secured a share in the cooperative by staking their plots along with those of other members in the common land pool. By 1956 the transformation of mutual aid teams into agricultural cooperatives was nearly complete. By the end of that year, moreover, the great majority of cooperatives had moved to a still higher stage of collectivization, having become advanced producers' cooperatives. These cooperatives contrasted with those of the earlier stage in that members no longer earned income based on shares of land owned. Instead, collective farm profits were distributed to members primarily on the basis of labor contributions. The average cooperative was made up of 170 families and more than 700 people. Although small private plots were permitted, most of the land was owned collectively by the cooperative. Another development in this period was the establishment of state farms in which land became the property of the state.

This degree of collectivization was achieved with much less turmoil than had occurred during collectivization in the Soviet Union. As in the Soviet Union, however, investment in the agricultural sector was kept low relative to industrial investment because planners chose to achieve more rapid growth of basic industries. But collectivization did not prevent the growth of agricultural production; grain production, for example, increased by 3.5 percent a year under the First Five-Year Plan (1953–57). Growth was achieved mainly through the intensified use of traditional agricultural techniques, together with some technical improvements.

Once collectivization was achieved and agricultural output per capita began to increase, the leadership embarked on the extremely ambitious programs of the Great Leap Forward of 1958–60. In agriculture this meant unrealistically high production goals and an even higher degree of collectivization than had already been achieved. The existing collectives were organized very rapidly into people's communes, much larger units with an average of 5,400 households and a total of 20,000 to 30,000 members on average. The production targets were not accompanied by a sufficient amount of capital and modern inputs such as fertilizer; rather, they were to be reached in large measure by heroic efforts on the part of the peasants, often beaten into submission by overzealous party cadres.

Substantial effort was expended during the Great Leap Forward on large-scale but often poorly planned capital construction projects, such as irrigation works and 'backyard furnaces'. Because of the intense pressure for results, the rapidity of the change, and the inexperience and resistance of many cadres and peasants, the Great Leap Forward soon ran into massive difficulties. The peasants became exhausted from the unremitting pressure to produce. The inflation of production statistics, on the theory that accuracy mattered less than political effect, resulted in extravagant claims. Disruption of agricultural activity and transportation produced food shortages. In addition, the weather in 1959–61 was unfavorable – though this took a minor role compared to governmental inefficiency and overambitious campaigns, and agricultural production declined sharply. By the early 1960s, therefore, agriculture was severely depressed, with millions of Chinese starving due to grain requisitions by the government. Records show despite famine and widespread starvation in the countryside, Beijing still denied the existence of any agricultural problems and continued to send grain and other food resources abroad to the USSR, East Germany and Albania. By 1962 the government finally admitted defeat and China was forced to import grain (despite in the 1950s being a net exporter) to supply urban areas. Otherwise, an excessive amount of grain would have been extracted from rural areas. Records differ on the extent of the damage caused by the Great Leap Forward, often because government statistics either were not taken, underexaggerated or were completely fabricated. However, the common estimate for the number of Chinese who starved, or were worked or beaten to death 1958–1962, agreed by several historians is around 45 million.

Large-scale irrigation projects begun during the late 1950s as part of the Great Leap Forward continued to grow rapidly until the late 1970s.

=== Importance of agriculture recognized ===
Faced with this depression, the country's leaders initiated policies to strengthen the agricultural sector. The government increased incentives for individual and collective production, decentralized certain management functions, and expanded the role of private plots and markets. The people's commune system was reorganized so that production teams with 20 to 30 households and 90 to 140 people owned most of the assets, accounted for profits or losses, made economic decisions, and distributed income. Most important, the leadership embarked on policies designed to put "agriculture first" in planning, at least in principle. This meant more modern inputs for the countryside. Chemical fertilizer production and imports increased. Modern high-yielding seed varieties began to be developed. Irrigation facilities – many of which had been washed out during disastrous floods in 1959–61 – were repaired and expanded, and the government began to provide more mechanical pumps and other irrigation equipment.

These improvements were not haphazard; most were focused on more advanced and productive areas. The intent was to build areas of modernized agriculture with high and stable yields that would form the basis for more stable agricultural production. In general, the places designated as "high- and stable-yield areas" were those with adequate irrigation and drainage, so that the payoff for greater use of fertilizer and new seeds would be higher.

=== Recovery ===
By the mid-1970s China's economy had recovered from the failures of the Great Leap Forward. In 1979 per capita grain output first surpassed previous peak levels achieved in 1957. In addition, small enterprises in the mid-1960s began to produce substantial quantities of chemical fertilizer. Government researchers developed fertilizer-responsive seeds. Focusing these inputs on the high- and stable-yield areas meant that parts of China that were already advanced tended to be favored over backward or less-developed regions, thus widening a gap that already had potentially serious implications.

At the same time, the government urged poorer areas to rely mainly on their own efforts. This was symbolized, especially during the Cultural Revolution, by the campaign to "learn from Dazhai". Dazhai is a town in Shanxi province that overcame poverty and poor production conditions to become relatively wealthy. The authorities claimed that this was accomplished through self-reliance and struggle. Dazhai became a model of political organization and its leaders national emulation models as well.

These policies – "agriculture first," emphasis on the supply of modern inputs, and the Dazhai and other models – formed the framework for agricultural development from the early 1960s until the post-Mao era. The Cultural Revolution caused some disruption in the agricultural sector, such as political struggle sessions and changes in local leadership, but not nearly as much as in the industrial sector.

=== Post-Mao policies ===
When the party leadership began to evaluate progress in the agricultural sector in the light of its campaign to move the nation toward the ambitious targets of the Four Modernizations, it noted disappointing failures along with some impressive gains. Furthermore, even though per capita grain production increased from the depressed levels of the early 1960s, output stagnated in the 1975–77 period, so that in 1978 per capita production was still not above average levels of the 1950s. Production of other major crops grew even more slowly. The leadership decided in 1978 to thoroughly revamp the rural economic system.

Top government and party leaders decided to dismantle the people's commune system and restructure it into a new rural system – the township-collective-household system – consisting of five parts: local government, party, state and collective economic entities, and households. Whereas the commune system integrated politics, administration, and economics into one unit, the new system was designed to have separate institutions handle specific functions. Townships, the basic unit of government in pre-commune days, were reconstructed to handle government and administrative functions. Party committees were to concentrate on party affairs. Economic collectives were organized to manage economic affairs. Households were encouraged to sign contracts with economic collectives.

The reform of the commune system fundamentally changed the way farmers were motivated to work. Nonmaterial incentive policies, such as intergroup competitions for red flags, were downplayed. Egalitarian distribution of grain rations declined, and the work payment system in effect on and off since the 1950s was scrapped. Rural cadres adopted an entirely new scheme to motivate farmers, called baogan (household production responsibility) system. Under baogan, economic cooperatives assigned specific plots of land to a family to cultivate for up to fifteen years. For each piece of land, the economic cooperative specified the quantity of output that had to be delivered to procurement stations. The contract also outlined household obligations, such as contributions to capital accumulation and welfare funds; the number of days to be contributed to maintenance of water control systems; and debt repayment schedules. Output raised in excess of state and collective obligations was the reward to the household. Families could consume the surplus or sell it in rural markets as they wished. Baogan permitted families to raise income through hard work, good management, wise use of technology, and reduction of production costs.

While the overall level of investment within the agricultural sector did not change much during the reform period, substantial changes took place in investment patterns. National leaders called for greater investment in agriculture, but actual state expenditures declined in the first part of the 1980s. Whereas communes had invested considerable sums in agriculture, the rate of investment from the newly formed economic cooperatives was far below the rate before the reform. The revitalization and extension of the rural banking system (the Agricultural Bank and rural credit cooperatives) and favorable lending policies did provide a small but steady source of investment funds for the sector. The major change, however, was that after 1978 farm families were allowed to invest funds, and their investment in small tractors, rural industry, and housing was substantial. In 1983 rural households invested ¥21 billion in housing compared with ¥11 billion from state sources.

Mao Zedong's policy of self-reliance was relaxed, and his dictum "grow grain everywhere" was abandoned. Farm households began to produce crops and animals best suited for their natural conditions. Excellent cotton growing land in Shandong that had grown grain during the Cultural Revolution returned to growing cotton. Areas sown with grain crops declined, and areas sown with cotton, oilseeds, and other cash crops expanded. Reform policies also reduced major administrative barriers that had limited labor and capital from moving beyond commune boundaries. Households with insufficient labor or little inclination to farm were able to transfer land contracts to families that were interested in cultivation and animal husbandry. Rural workers were permitted to shift from crop cultivation to commercial, service, construction, and industrial activities in rural townships. Capital in rural areas was permitted to move across administrative boundaries, and individuals invested not only in their own farm production but also in business ventures outside their own villages.

The rural marketing system changed substantially in the post-Mao period. The system of mandatory sales of farm produce to local state purchasing stations ended, as did state rationing of food grains, cooking oil, and cotton cloth to consumers. Households with marketable surpluses had several options: goods could be consumed on the farm, sold in local markets, or sold to state stations according to signed purchase contracts. Rural markets disbanded during the Cultural Revolution were reopened, and the number of markets rose from 33,000 in 1978 to 61,000 in 1985. Total trade in these markets increased from ¥12.5 billion in 1978 to ¥63.2 billion in 1985. Consumers purchased food and daily necessities in stores run by the state, cooperatives, and private entrepreneurs and in local free markets. Coincident with these reforms, the state raised procurement prices to improve incentives and increase production by farmers. From 1966 to 1982, wheat and rice procurement prices rose by 66 percent, while oilseed prices increased 85 percent. To avoid urban discontent over high prices, the state absorbed the increasing additional costs, and retail prices for these goods remained constant.

The new policies quickly began to produce results. The gross value of agricultural output nearly doubled from 1978 to 1985. Production of grain, oilseeds, cotton, and livestock increased rapidly in this period . Per capita net income of peasant households rose dramatically from ¥134 in 1978 to ¥397 in 1985, but income inequality increased. The demise of collective institutions, however, brought decreases in health, education, and welfare services. Less attention was paid to maintaining the environment, and some water, soil, and forest resources were wasted. Despite this, mid-1980s observers opined that prospects were good for an overall rise in rural prosperity.

Reforms in the late 1970s and early 1980s also swept away policies and administrative rules restricting business activity. Old commune production and brigade enterprises were reorganized, and a host of new firms were founded by economic cooperatives and citizens. Business activity included manufacturing, mining, transportation, catering, construction, and services. By the mid-1980s the value generated by these enterprises surpassed the value of output from raising crops and livestock.

== Planning and organization ==
The state's role in the mid-1980s was chiefly to plan production and manage resources. Among state institutions at the national level, the Ministry of Agriculture, Animal Husbandry, and Fishery was primarily responsible for coordinating agricultural programs. Other central bodies of importance in agricultural policy matters included the State Economic Commission; the State Planning Commission; the ministries of commerce, forestry, and the chemical industry; the State Statistical Bureau; and the Agricultural Bank; and various academies and institutions that conducted research on agricultural science, agricultural economics, and related subjects.

Between state institutions at the national level and the townships and villages at the base of the administrative hierarchy were various provincial-level, prefectural, and county-level government organs that also administered programs, including some agricultural research and extension activities. Some 2,000 county-level units coordinated programs and enforced policies with the economic cooperatives and households in their jurisdictions. County-level units sometimes operated their own chemical fertilizer plants or other factories producing basic agricultural items, and they helped direct the allocation of the materials produced to peasant farmers.

Some agricultural production occurred on state farms where workers received regular wages, like factory workers. State farms were mostly found on the fringes of the main agricultural areas, especially on newly reclaimed land and particularly in the northeast, where they nevertheless accounted for only about 4 percent of total cultivated land.

Most of the economic activity in rural areas took place within the context of collectively and privately owned enterprises. Economic cooperatives, enterprises, and households were guided by their own self-sufficiency requirements, pursuit of profits, and compliance with annual economic plans. Forces of self-sufficiency continued to play an important role in decision making, especially as farm households allocated resources to ensure their own food grain rations. The pursuit of profit traditionally had been a driving force in rural areas, and although this energy had largely been curbed in the past, in the 1980s farmers were encouraged to seek profits.

The state drafted annual economic plans that were passed down through administrative channels to assist local cadres. Operators of farms and other enterprises reviewed the plan targets, which guided them to make proper economic decisions. The state has used both direct and indirect methods to affect decisions. In past decades cadres decided what would be produced, what production techniques were to be employed, and how output was to be distributed on the basis of annual plans. Indirect controls, such as prices and interest rates, became more important after 1980. Different combinations of the forces of self-sufficiency, profits, and state plans affected decision making for a given product in a given year. For example, in 1985 cotton farmers were told via state plans how much area to plant in cotton, whereas farmers received no state plans to sow fields with melons; rather, they planted melons in the hope of increasing profits.

The state continued to control the economic behavior of farm households, economic cooperatives, and enterprises through powerful political and administrative mechanisms in the late 1980s. The first of these mechanisms was the more than 83,000 township governments, which were responsible for civil and military affairs, public security (police), family planning, and statistics. Village committees numbered more than 940,000 and were subordinate to townships. Although they were not formal government institutions, they maintained public order, managed welfare services, and oversaw water conservation projects. Probably the most powerful entities on the local level were Chinese Communist Party committees in townships and the subordinate party branches in villages. More than 20 million rural party members staffed posts and headed committees that supervised all aspects of rural life. They coordinated relations between party, government, and economic entities, and they ensured that party policies were followed. They nominated candidates to administrative posts and approved applications for military service, jobs, and opportunities for higher education (see Rural society in the People's Republic of China).

The second mechanism – control of marketing functions – gave the state powerful tools to influence agricultural decisions. As in other centrally planned economies, the state was responsible for organizing and directing a major part of the flow of resources between sectors. It could achieve this using a variety of means, including prices and markets as well as direct controls. It needed to balance the needs of various sectors for input such as fuel, cement, timber, and machinery (as well as the needs of consumers in both rural and urban areas) in trying to meet its goals. The government procured grain and other agricultural products from the peasants to supply urban areas and food-deficient regions with subsistence and to provide raw materials for textile and other light industries. Part of the required amount was obtained simply as a direct tax. The proportion obtained from taxes declined over time, however, and the tax in 1984 was less than 3 percent of the value of total production. The remainder was obtained through purchases by state procurement agencies.

In the period from 1957 to 1978, the state raised prices for agricultural produce while lowering the prices of basic items such as fertilizer and fuel used in agricultural production. This was necessary to promote the use of more fertilizer and fuel to obtain greater production and to provide incentives for the production and sale of agricultural commodities.

As a third mechanism, the state exercised considerable leverage in rural affairs through its control over credit and agricultural production supplies. The state owned and controlled some 27,000 agricultural banks that served rural areas and provided production loans. Agricultural banks also supervised the activities of more than 42,000 credit cooperatives that provided banking services for cooperatives and rural households and provided production and consumer loans to customers. The state controlled banking activities through administrative regulations, loan policy, and interest rates. The state regulated delivery of fertilizer, machinery, and fuel through its marketing channels. In addition, government control of water and electricity supplies provided the state with an important lever to induce farmers to comply with political policies and economic plans.

Finally, local governments possessed considerable influence in local affairs because they delivered social welfare services. Economic cooperatives and peasant households were not likely to engage in activities that could lead to diminishing supplies of social services. Rural families desired and increasingly felt entitled to medical, education, welfare, and cultural benefits. Villages competed to have these facilities located within their boundaries, not only to have more convenient access to their services but also to take advantage of the employment opportunities they afforded.

== Operational methods and inputs ==
China's farmers have long used techniques such as fertilization and irrigation to increase the productivity of their scarce land. Over time, many farming techniques have been modernized: chemical fertilizers have supplemented organic fertilizers, and mechanical pumps have come into use in irrigation. Government planners in the 1980s emphasized increased use of fertilizer, improved irrigation, mechanization of agriculture, and extension of improved seed varieties as leading features of the agricultural modernization program.

=== Cropping patterns ===
All of these elements of modern agriculture are used in the context of the traditional intensive cropping patterns. To maximize year-round use of the land, two or more crops are planted each year where possible. Rice, wheat, cotton, vegetable, and other crop seedlings are sometimes raised in special seedbeds and then transplanted to fields. Transplanting shortens the time required for a crop to mature, which allows farmers the opportunity to squeeze in an additional crop each growing season. Another method to make optimum use of scarce land is to plant seedlings in a mature stand of another crop. For example, when planting winter wheat in October, farmers in the north leave spaces among the rows so that cotton seedlings can be planted or transplanted in April and May. Without intercropping, farmers could raise only one crop a year. Mechanization supports this intensive cropping pattern. Despite a huge rural labor force, labor shortages occur each season when farmers are required to harvest one crop and plant another in its place, all within the space of a few weeks. In the 1980s farmers invested in harvesting and planting machinery to overcome the shortage of labor. Seed breeders also supported intensive cropping patterns by selecting and breeding varieties that had shorter growing seasons.

=== Fertilizer ===
Intensive use of the arable soil made the use of fertilizer imperative to replace nutrients and to help improve yields. Organic fertilizers have long supplied the bulk of soil nutrients and have helped to maintain the structure of the soil. Over the centuries, use of organic fertilizers also increased with the growth in population and with the increased size of livestock herds. Human waste was used extensively as fertilizer in imperial China, particularly in the south. This practice began to decline after 1911 under the influence of modern concepts of public health, although the efficacy of the system for using human waste as manure meant that these changes were slow.

Peasants have traditionally used a large proportion of their labor in collecting organic materials for fertilizers. Use has been especially heavy in south China, where more intensive cropping has required more fertilizer and where the sources of fertilizer have been more abundant. Chemical fertilizers, however, have been used more widely since the 1960s. Use of chemical fertilizers in 1985 was more than 150 kilograms per hectare, measured in nutrient weight. The country's considerable future requirements were to be met by chemical fertilizer because of the natural limits on rapid increases in production of organic fertilizers.

Production and imports of chemical fertilizers increased rapidly under the "agriculture first" programs of the early 1960s. The domestic industry was expanded, partly with the help of imported fertilizer factories, and production reached 1.7 million tons by 1965. Imports in 1965 were more than 600,000 tons. In the mid-1960s the government also began to emphasize the production of nitrogen fertilizer in small plants, usually operated by counties, that yielded about 10,000 tons per year. Their products were used locally, which helped conserve transportation resources. In 1972 the government contracted to import thirteen large-scale urea plants, each capable of producing more than 1 million tons of standard nitrogen fertilizer a year. By 1980 these were in operation, and total chemical fertilizer production in 1985 was 13.4 million tons, of which 12.3 million tons were nitrogen fertilizer. Imports added another 7.6 million tons.

In the 1980s chemical fertilizer use per hectare was less than the Japanese and Korean averages but more than the Indonesian and Indian averages. Future production and imports were likely to emphasize phosphate and potassium content in order to balance the nutrients obtained from organic fertilizers and from existing factories. Institutional reforms in the early 1980s encouraged households to cut costs and maximize earnings, which probably led to more efficient use of chemical fertilizer as farmers applied fertilizer to those crops giving the highest rates of return.

=== Mechanization ===
Post-Mao reforms dramatically affected farm mechanization. Most commune tractor stations were disbanded, and farm households were allowed to purchase equipment. The percentage of privately owned tractors increased from near zero in 1975 to more than 80 percent in 1985. The area plowed and planted by machine decreased in this period, but peasant use of tractors and trucks to transport goods soared dramatically. As much as 60 percent of tractor use was devoted to local hauling. Firms manufacturing farm machinery adjusted to the shift in rural organization by producing more small tractors, appropriate tractor-drawn equipment, better quality hand tools, and food and feed processing equipment. A rural electric power system – dams, generators, and transmission lines – had been under construction since 1949, and in 1987 most villages had access to electricity. In the period of the Four Modernizations, rural electric power consumption rose by 179 percent, from 18.3 billion kilowatt-hours in 1975 to 51.2 billion kilowatt-hours in 1985.

Despite the large stock and high production rate of tractors, most farm tasks in the mid-1980s were performed manually. Rice continued to be transplanted by hand, as local engineers had yet to develop and produce rice transplanters in substantial quantities. Only 36 percent of the land was plowed by machines, only 8 percent sown by machines, and only 3 percent of the crop area was harvested by machines. Draft animals continued to be important sources of power, and the number of animals increased sharply in the post-Mao period. Success in mechanization enabled surplus rural laborers to leave the fields to find jobs in rural industry and commerce. In the 1980s most observers believed that China would continue for some time to use mechanization to solve labor shortages at times of peak labor demand and to concentrate mechanization in areas of large-scale farming, as in the North China Plain and the northeast.

=== Water conservancy ===
Irrigation was important in China's traditional agriculture, and some facilities existed as long as 2,000 years ago. The extension of water conservancy facilities by labor-intensive means was an important part of the agricultural development programs of the 1950s. During the Great Leap Forward, a number of water conservancy projects were undertaken, but with insufficient planning and capital. During the turmoil and bad weather of 1959–61, many water conservancy works were washed out by floods or otherwise destroyed, considerably reducing the irrigated acreage. Facilities were rebuilt in the early 1960s. By the 1980s irrigation facilities covered nearly half the cultivated land; systems installed since the late 1960s extended over a considerable part of north China, especially on the North China Plain.

In the era of post-Mao reform, irrigation and drainage systems expanded to increase the stock of stable and high-yielding land. The inventory of mechanical pumps also greatly increased; powered irrigation equipment reached almost 80 million horsepower in 1985. In this period the government began to charge fees for the water the farmers used, and farmers therefore limited the amount of water applied to their crops on a benefit cost basis. The reorganization of rural institutions weakened administrative measures necessary to make large- scale waterworks function. Lowered investment, poor maintenance, and outright damage to facilities lessened the effectiveness of the system. Adding additional acreage was likely to be increasingly costly because areas not under irrigation were remote from easily tapped water sources. In the mid-1980s government officials recognized the problems and undertook to correct them.

North China is chronically short of water and subject to frequent droughts. A considerable proportion of its irrigation water comes from wells. Officials in the Ministry of Water Resources (and its predecessors) have periodically proposed diverting water from the Yangtze River to irrigate the North China Plain. The enormous expense of constructing such a project has precluded its realization. Farmers have also been encouraged to use sprinkler systems, a more efficient use of scarce water resources than flood-type irrigation systems.

=== Pest control ===
In 1987 the main method of weed and insect control continued to be labor-intensive cultivation. Fields were carefully tended, and a variety of biological controls, such as breeding natural enemies of crop pests, were used. Production and use of chemical herbicides and pesticides increased rapidly from the mid-1950s to the mid-1970s, but output fell subsequently by more than half (to about 200,000 tons) because the products were relatively ineffective, expensive, and highly toxic. Chemical pesticide use, therefore, was low compared with use in other countries.

=== Seed varieties ===
Improved seed varieties have contributed significantly to improving crop yields. Highly fertilizer-responsive varieties came into use beginning in the mid-1960s. These were comparable to those developed outside China but were adapted to the shorter growing season imposed by multiple cropping. Their extensive use has complemented the large increases in fertilizer use and the increase in irrigated area. In the mid-1970s farmers began to plant hybrid rice, claiming yield increases of more than 20 percent. Hybrid rice is not used elsewhere because of the amount of labor it requires, but more than 6 million hectares of it were planted in the mid-1980s, accounting for 20 percent of total rice area. The China National Seed Company was established in 1978 to popularize improved seed varieties; it exported Chinese vegetable seeds and imported improved grain, cotton, forage, and oil seeds. About 5 percent of China's arable land was being used to raise seed in the mid-1980s, and the company operated more than 2,000 seed companies at provincial, prefectural, and county levels.

=== Agricultural science ===
Agricultural science suffered from changes in policy and emphasis after the 1950s. The Cultural Revolution disrupted agricultural science training and research programs, but since the mid-1970s training and research programs have been restored. Government officials emphasized practical, production-oriented scientific work. The rural extension system popularized new techniques and new inputs, such as sprinkler irrigation systems. In 1987 eighty-four agricultural colleges and research institutes pursued research in seven broad fields: agriculture, forestry, aquatic production, land reclamation, mechanization, water conservation, and meteorology. In addition, almost 500 agricultural schools had a total staff of 29,000 teachers and 71,000 students. Since the early 1980s thousands of researchers and students were sent abroad. Research was being strengthened by the construction of sixteen regionally distributed agricultural experiment stations. New agricultural journals and societies were established to promote the dissemination of research results within the country. The Chinese sought technical information abroad as well through the import of technology and machinery and the international exchange of delegations.

== Production ==
Five economic activities generated the bulk of agricultural output: crops, livestock, forestry, fishery, and sideline production (rural industry). Crop raising was the dominant activity, generating as much as 80 percent of the total value of output in the mid-1950s. The policy of stressing crop output was relaxed in the early 1980s, and by 1985 this figure fell to about 50 percent. The proportion of output generated by the livestock, forestry, and fishery sectors increased slowly after the 1950s. The sector that expanded the most rapidly was sideline production, whose share increased from 4 percent in 1955 to 30 percent in 1985.

The results of China's agricultural policies in terms of output have been mixed. Food consumption was maintained at subsistence level despite the catastrophic drop in production following the Great Leap Forward but failed to increase much above that level until the 1980s. Investment in irrigation and water control projects blunted the effects of severe weather on output, but in many parts of the country production continued to be negatively affected by the weather. Production rates varied considerably throughout the country, creating income inequalities. Despite rapid gains in rural areas in the 1980s, a substantial gap remained between rural and urban living standards.

=== Crops ===
In the mid-1980s China's farmers annually planted crops on about 145 million hectares of land. Eighty percent of the land was sown with grain, 5 percent with oilseed crops, 5 percent with fruits, 3 percent with vegetables, 2 percent with fiber crops, and 0.5 percent with sugar crops and tobacco. Other crops made up the remaining 4 percent. In the 1960s and 1970s, when policies emphasized grain output, the area sown with grain exceeded 85 percent. After the reforms were launched in the early 1980s, the area sown with grain fell below 80 percent and the area sown with other crops expanded correspondingly.

Grain is China's most important agricultural product. It is the source of most of the calories and protein in the average diet and accounts for a sizable proportion of the value of agricultural production. China's statisticians define grain to include wheat, rice, corn, sorghum, millet, potatoes (at one-fifth their fresh weight), soybeans, barley, oats, buckwheat, field peas, and beans. Grain output paralleled the increase in population from 1949 through 1975 but rose rapidly in the decade between 1975 and 1985.

In 1987 China was the world's largest producer of rice, and the crop made up a little less than half of the country's total grain output. In a given year total rice output came from four different crops. The early rice crop grows primarily in provinces along the Yangtze River and in provinces in the south; it is planted in February to April and harvested in June and July and contributes about 34 percent to total rice output. Intermediate and single-crop late rice grows in the southwest and along the Yangtze River; it is planted in March to June and harvested in October and November and also contributed about 34 percent to total rice output in the 1980s. Double-crop late rice, planted after the early crop is reaped, is harvested in October to November and adds about 25 percent to total rice production. Rice grown in the north is planted from April to June and harvested from September to October; it contributes about 7 percent to total production.

All rice cultivation is highly labor-intensive. Rice is generally grown as a wetland crop in fields flooded to supply water during the growing season. Transplanting seedlings requires many hours of labor, as does harvesting. Mechanization of rice cultivation is only minimally advanced. Rice cultivation also demands more of other inputs, such as fertilizer, than most other crops.

Rice is highly prized by consumers as a food grain, especially in south China, and per capita consumption has risen through the years. Also, as incomes have risen, consumers have preferred to eat more rice and less potatoes, corn, sorghum, and millet. Large production increases in the early 1980s and poor local transportation systems combined to induce farmers to feed large quantities of lower quality rice to livestock.

In 1987 China ranked third in the world as a producer of wheat. Winter wheat, which in the same year accounted for about 88 percent of total national output, is grown primarily in the Yangtze River Valley and on the North China Plain. The crop is sown each fall from September through November and is harvested in May and June the subsequent year. Spring wheat is planted each spring in the north and northeast and is harvested in late summer. Spring wheat contributes about 12 percent of total wheat output.

Wheat is the staple food grain in north China and is eaten in the form of steamed bread and noodles. Per capita consumption has risen, and the demand for wheat flour has increased as incomes have risen. Wheat has been by far the most important imported grain.

Corn is grown in most parts of the country but is most common in areas that also produce wheat. Corn production has increased substantially over time and in some years has been second only to production of rice. Consumers have traditionally considered corn less desirable for human use than rice or wheat. Nevertheless, it frequently yields more per unit of land than other varieties of grain, making it useful for maintaining subsistence. As incomes rose in the early 1980s, consumer demand for corn as a food grain decreased, and increasing quantities of corn were allocated for animal feed.

Millet and sorghum are raised in the northern provinces, primarily in areas affected by drought. Millet is used primarily as a food grain. Sorghum is not a preferred food grain and in the 1980s was used for livestock feed and maotai, a potent alcoholic beverage.

Both Irish and sweet potatoes are grown in China. In the 1980s about 20 percent of output came from Irish potatoes grown mostly in the northern part of the country. The remaining 80 percent of output came primarily from sweet potatoes grown in central and south China (cassava output was also included in total potato production). Potatoes are generally considered to be a somewhat lower-quality food grain. Per capita consumption has declined through time. Potatoes are also used in the production of vodka and as a livestock feed.

Other grains, such as field peas, beans, and pulses, are grown throughout China. These grains are good sources of plant protein and add variety to the diet. Barley is a major grain produced in the lower Yangtze River Basin. It is used for direct human consumption, livestock feed, and increasingly is in great demand as a feedstock to produce beer.

Soybeans, a leguminous crop, are also included in China's grain statistics. The northeast has traditionally been the most important producing area, but substantial amounts of soybeans are also produced on the North China Plain. Production of soybeans declined after the Great Leap Forward, and output did not regain the 10-million-ton level of the late 1950s until 1985. Population growth has greatly outstripped soybean output, and per capita consumption has fallen. Soybeans are a useful source of protein and fat, an important consideration given the limited amount of meat available and the grain- and vegetable-based diet. Oilseed cakes, by-products of soybean oil extraction, are used as animal feed and fertilizer.

Cotton is China's most important fiber crop. The crop is grown on the North China Plain and in the middle and lower reaches of the Yangtze River Valley. In the 1970s domestic output did not meet demand, and significant quantities of raw cotton were imported. Production expanded dramatically in the early 1980s to reach a record 6 million tons in 1984. Although production declined to 4.2 million tons in 1985, China was still by far the largest cotton producer in the world. In the 1980s raw cotton imports ceased, and China became a major exporter of cotton.

Significant quantities of jute and hemp are also produced in China. Production of these crops expanded from 257,000 tons in 1955 to 3.4 million tons in 1985. Major producing provinces include Heilongjiang and Henan and also provinces along the Yangtze River.

China is an important producer of oilseeds, including peanuts, rapeseed, sesame seed, sunflower seed, and safflower seed. Oilseed output in 1955 was 4.8 million tons. Output, however, did not expand between 1955 and 1975, which meant per capita oilseed availability decreased substantially because of population growth. Production from 1975 to 1985 more than tripled, to 15.5 million tons, but China continues to have one of the world's lowest levels of per capita consumption of oilseeds.

Sugarcane accounted for about 83 percent of total output of sugar crops in 1985. Major producing provinces include Guangdong, Fujian, and Yunnan provinces and Guangxi. Production has grown steadily through the years from about 8 million tons in 1955 to over 51 million tons in 1985.

Sugar beet production accounted for the remaining 17 percent of total output in 1985. Major producing provinces and autonomous regions include Heilongjiang, Jilin, Inner Mongolia, and Xinjiang. Sugar beet production rose from 1.6 million tons in 1955 to 8.9 million tons in 1985. Despite these impressive increases in output, per capita consumption was still very low, and large quantities were imported. China is the world's largest producer of leaf tobacco. Farmers produce many kinds of tobacco, but flue-cured varieties often make up more than 80 percent of total output. Major producing areas include Henan, Shandong, Sichuan, Guizhou, and Yunnan provinces.

Tea and silk, produced mainly in the south, have traditionally been important commercial crops. The domestic market for these products has been substantial, and they continue to be important exports.

Given China's different agricultural climatic regions, many varieties of vegetables are grown. Farmers raise vegetables in private plots for their own consumption. Near towns and cities, farmers grow vegetables for sale to meet the demand of urban consumers. Vegetables are an important source of vitamins and minerals in the diet.

Temperate, subtropical, and tropical fruits are cultivated in China. Output expanded from 2.6 million tons in 1955 to more than 11 million tons in 1985. Reforms in the early 1980s encouraged farmers to plant orchards, and the output of apples, pears, bananas, and citrus fruit was expected to expand in the late 1980s.

=== Animal husbandry ===
In 1987 China had the largest inventory of hogs in the world. The number increased from about 88 million in 1955 to an estimated 331 million in 1985. Hogs are raised in large numbers in every part of China except in Muslim areas in the northwest. Most hogs are raised in pens by individual farm households, but in the mid-1980s the Chinese were constructing large mechanized feeding operations on the outskirts of major cities. Before the 1980s the state's major goal was to increase output with little regard to the ratio of meat to fat. In the 1980s consumers became more conscious of fat content, and breeders and raisers were shifting to the production of leaner hogs.

Draft animals are important sources of motive power in rural areas. Draft animal numbers increased steadily from about 56 million in 1955 to 67 million in 1985 despite rapid increases in the number of tractors and trucks in rural areas. Animals that provide draft power for crop cultivation and rural transportation include water buffalo, horses, mules, donkeys, oxen, and camels.

Sheep and goats are China's most important grazing animals. Most of these animals are bred in the semi-arid steppes and deserts in the north, west, and northwest. The number of sheep and goats has expanded steadily from about 42 million in 1949 to approximately 156 million in 1985. Overgrazed, fragile rangelands have been seriously threatened by erosion, and in the late 1980s authorities were in the midst of a campaign to improve pastures and rangelands and limit erosion.

The dairy and poultry sectors of the livestock economy grew most rapidly in the 1980s. Dairy cows numbered just under 500,000 in 1978 but tripled to around 1.5 million in 1985. Consumers with rising incomes demanded more fresh and powdered milk for infants and elderly people. A large part of this increased demand was met by individual farmers who were permitted to purchase and own their animals. The government supported increased milk output by importing breeding animals and constructing large dairies and processing facilities. Most poultry was still grown in farmyard flocks, but reforms encouraged individuals and groups of households to invest in confined feeding operations. Egg output, especially, increased rapidly in the 1980s.

China's first modern feed mills were constructed in the 1970s, followed by many mills equipped with imported technology. Production of mixed and compound feed grew rapidly, reaching more than 12 million tons in 1985. This development supported the growth of animal husbandry.

=== Forestry ===
Forests were cleared in China's main agricultural areas centuries ago. Most timber, therefore, comes from northeast China and the less densely populated parts of the northwest and southwest. The yield totaled around 60 million cubic meters in 1985. Bamboo poles and products are grown in the Yangtze River Valley and in south China, and output reached 230 million poles in 1985. Rubber trees are cultivated in Guangdong; output rose steadily from 68,000 tons in 1975 to 190,000 tons in 1985. Other important forestry products include lacquer, tea oilseed, tung oil, pine resin, walnuts, chestnuts, plywood, and fiberboard.

The area covered by forests amounted to some 12 percent of total land area, which officials hoped to increase over the long term to 30 percent. Afforestation campaigns were carried out annually to re-establish forests, plant shelter belts, and set up soil stabilization areas. But because of continued overcutting of forests and low seedling survival rates in newly planted sections, China's forests have been in a precarious situation. Better management and increased investment over a long period of time were required to increase output of valuable forest products.

=== Fishery ===
Aquatic production increased slowly after the 1950s, reaching 6.2 million tons in 1985. Output is composed of both marine and freshwater fish, shellfish, and kelp. Marine products contributed 63 percent to total aquatic production. Fishermen collected more than 83 percent of marine output from the open seas. The remaining 17 percent of output came from sea farms along China's coasts.

The freshwater catch accounted for 37 percent of total aquatic output in the mid-1980s. Fish farming in ponds accounted for 80 percent of the total freshwater catch; only 20 percent was collected in natural rivers, lakes, and streams. Fish from all sources provided consumers with an important source of protein and added variety in their diet.

=== Sideline production ===
In addition to improving the principal yield of agricultural units, the post-Mao reform and opening up greatly stimulated sideline production in rural areas. Before 1984 sideline production generated by production brigades, production teams, and households included hunting, fishing, collecting wild herbs, and producing family handicrafts, as well as various kinds of industry, commerce, transportation, and services. Sideline industrial output included fertilizer, farm machinery, textiles, bricks, electrical appliances, and various consumer goods. Sideline industrial activities also included processing cotton, grain, and oilseeds; mining coal, iron ore, and gold; and dredging gravel and sand. Among the services included in sideline output were barbering, entertainment, and catering. As part of the sideline economy, rural entities transported people and goods and operated retail stores; rural construction groups built dams, factory sites, roads, and houses. Of all kinds of sideline production, the state counted only the industrial output of enterprises operated by counties and communes in its total industrial output.

Output rose so rapidly that by 1985 the value of production generated in sidelines exceeded the value of principal crop and livestock production. To make the gross value of agricultural output more realistically represent agricultural production, statisticians in 1985 limited sideline production to hunting and fishing, collecting wild herbs, and producing family handicrafts. After 1985, therefore, there were at least three aggregate measures of economic performance: gross value of output; gross value of agricultural output (crops, livestock, forestry, aquatic, and sideline); and gross value of rural society, which included the gross value of agricultural output plus the value of rural industrial, transportation, construction, and other output.

Today, China is the world's largest producer and consumer of agricultural products :

Achievement	Date
Largest rice producer, output of 182,042,000 tons	2005
Largest wheat producer, output of 109.9 million metric tons	2007
Largest fruit and vegetable producer, output of 506,634,000 tons	2004
Largest apple producer, output of 26,065,500 tons	2006
Largest garlic producer, output of 12,088,000 tons	2008
Largest pear and quince producer, output of 11,537,000 tons	2005
Largest tangerine producer, output of 14,152,000 tons	2007
Largest peach and nectarine producer, output of 6,030,000 tons	2005
Largest plum and sloe producer, output of 4,635,500 tons	2005
Largest persimmon producer, output of 1,987,000 tons	2006
Largest tomato producer, output of 32,540,040 tons	2006
Largest watermelon producer, output of 69,315,000 tons	2005
Largest chestnut producer, output of 825,000 tons	2005
Largest walnut producer, output of 499,070 tons	2005
Largest peanut producer, output of 13,090,000 tons	2008
Largest eggplant producer, output of 18,033,000 tons	2008
Largest carrot and turnip producer, output of 8,395,500 tons	2005
Largest potato producer, output of 70 million metric tons	2006
Largest cabbage producer, output of 36,335,000 tons	2008
Largest cauliflowers and broccoli producer, output of 8,585,000 tons	2005
Largest spinach producer, output of 11,011,000 tons	2005
Largest lettuce and chicory producer, output of 11,005,000 tons	2005
Largest asparagus producer, output of 5,906,000 tons	2005
Largest onion and shallot producer, output of 17,793,000 tons	2005
Largest cucumber and gherkin producer, output of 26,000,000 tons	2005
Largest fish producer, output of 49,467,275 tons	2005
Largest aquatic plants producer, output of 11,163,675 tons	2005
Largest honey producer, output of 298,000 tons	2005
Largest mushroom and truffle producer, output of 1,410,540 tons	2005
Largest cotton producer, output of 11,400,000 tons	2005
Largest silk producer, output of 290,003 tons	2005
Largest rapeseed producer, output of 10.3 million metric tons	2007
Largest tea producer, output of 1,183,502 million tons	2007
Largest tobacco producer, output of 2,298,800 tons	2000

== Agricultural trade ==
Since 1949 agricultural exports for most years exceeded agricultural imports. China's officials used this export surplus as an important source for financing the importation of high-priority industrial items. Agricultural exports rose through the years but have not grown as fast as industrial exports. In 1970, for example, agricultural exports accounted for 45 percent of total exports, but in 1985 China's US$6.5 billion in agricultural exports was only 20 percent of the total exports.

In the 1970s agricultural imports accounted for about 30 percent of total imports. For example, of the US$7.1 billion worth of products imported in 1977, US$2.1 billion (30 percent) were agricultural products. In 1985 US$4.7 billion worth of agricultural products were imported, which was only 5 percent of the US$42.8 billion of total imports. The ratio of agricultural imports to other imports was expected to rise in the late 1980s and 1990s.

Wheat has been imported nearly every year since the early 1950s. These imports averaged about 5 million tons in the 1960s and 1970s but rose to a peak of more than 13 million tons in 1982. Wheat imports fell as wheat output expanded rapidly, so that by 1985 imports fell to just under 5.5 million tons. Argentina, Australia, Canada, France, and the United States have been major sources of China's wheat imports.

China has been one of the world's largest rice exporters, which had been annually shipping out about 1 million tons. Rice exports go primarily to Asian and East European countries and to Cuba.

China has been both an importer and an exporter of coarse grains. Up to 1984 sorghum, millet, and corn exports usually totaled only several hundred thousand tons but reached a peak of over 5 million tons in 1985. In the mid-1980s corn was shipped primarily to Japan, North Korea, and the Soviet Union. Barley is imported as a livestock feed and as a feedstock to brew beer. Corn is imported for human consumption and for livestock feed. Quantities imported varied considerably depending on internal supply conditions and prices in international markets. Large quantities of corn were imported during the Great Leap Forward (when grain production fell dramatically), in the early 1970s, and at the end of the 1970s, when corn imports hit a peak of 3.6 million tons. Major coarse grain suppliers include Argentina, Australia, Canada, France, Thailand, and the United States.

Soybeans have been a major foreign exchange earner for most of last century. Static production and rising domestic demand for soybeans and soybean products meant a decline in exports until the early 1980s. For example, in 1981 Argentina and the United States shipped more than 500,000 tons of soybeans to China; these two countries and Brazil also exported soybean oil to China. Domestic production expanded in the early 1980s, however, and by 1985 soybean imports fell and exports exceeded 1 million tons. Also in the early 1980s, China began to ship soybean meal to Asian markets.

Before 1983 China was one of the world's largest importers of raw cotton. These imports averaged around 100,000 tons annually but climbed to a peak of nearly 900,000 tons in 1980. A dramatic increase in domestic cotton production filled domestic demand, and exports exceeded imports in 1983. In 1985 China shipped nearly 500,000 tons of raw cotton to Asian and European markets.

Sugar imports to China came primarily from Australia, Cuba, the Philippines, and Thailand. Quantities imported climbed steadily from 100,000 tons in 1955 to 500,000 tons in the mid-1970s and continued to rise dramatically to a peak of more than 2 million tons in 1985.

In addition to the commodities just noted, China also exported a host of other products from its vast agricultural resources. Large quantities of live animals, meat, fish, vegetables, and fruits were shipped to Asian markets. Tea, spices, and essential oils were shipped to major international markets. China also exported animal products, such as hog bristles, fur, and other animal products.

Agricultural trade remained an important component of China's general agricultural modernization effort. China continued to import grain and other agricultural products. These imports were used to maintain or improve living standards, especially in urban areas. In rural areas, imports helped reduce the pressure for more procurement, freeing resources for increased consumption or investment in local agricultural programs.

In the long run, China reduced the expenditure of foreign exchange needed to finance agricultural imports. These expenditures reduced the amount of other imports that were used for modernization and investment in the nonagricultural sectors of the economy. Success in reducing agricultural imports depended on the development of domestic sources of supply, for which China hoped to rely in part on new production bases for marketable crops. Pressure for increased consumption continued. The increase in population and the need for more agricultural goods (including grain, industrial crops, and grain-consuming livestock) to support higher real incomes both in urban areas and in the new agricultural base areas continued to be factors creating this pressure.

== See also ==
- Agriculture in China
- Aquaculture in China
- History of the People's Republic of China
- Social structure of China#Agriculture
- Xiaonong Yishi
