= All politics is local =

Common political phrase

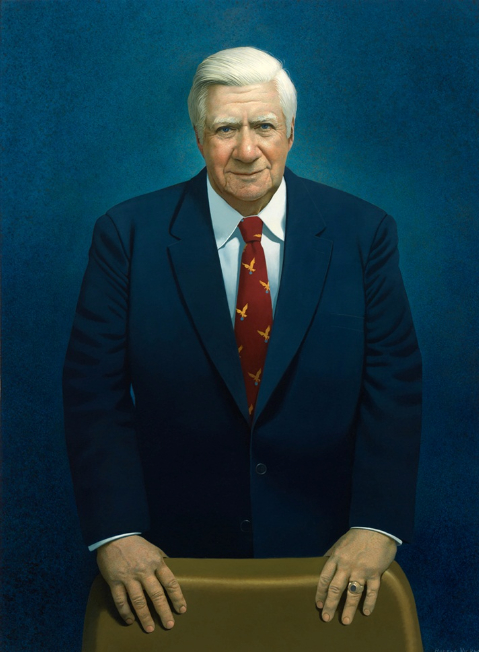
Tip O'Neill, 47th Speaker of the U.S. House of Representatives, is most closely associated with the phrase

The phrase "all politics is local" is commonly used in United States politics. Variations of the phrase date back to 1932. Tip O'Neill, who served as the 47th Speaker of the U.S. House of Representatives (1977–1987), is most closely associated with this phrase, although he did not originate it.

== Meaning and applicability ==
Andrew Gelman argues that the "local" refers to the fact that politicians "need local skills to win the primary election that gets them into their safe seat, and they need backroom political skills in the state legislature to keep their safe seats every 10 years." Gelman also argues, citing election data since 1968, that politics is "less local than it used to be."

== Origins and popularization ==
The expression was in use before its association with Tip O'Neill. In February of 1932, Associated Press journalist Byron Price wrote about the influence of precinct-level politics on national political developments, describing it as "all politics is local politics." The expression subsequently became the title of O'Neill's 1994 book, All Politics Is Local, and Other Rules of the Game, written with Gary Hymel.

== Example ==
Chris Matthews, former chief of staff to Tip O'Neill, wrote about the strategy adopted in the 1982 Congressional elections. Massachusetts lawyer Frank L. McNamara, Jr. challenged O'Neill's seat and financed most of his campaign with money from oil interests in Oklahoma and Texas. O'Neill played up the connections in the media by distributing literature highlighting McNamara's Texas fundraising.

Later during those elections, O'Neill introduced a $1-billion jobs bill. House Republican Leader Robert H. Michel of Peoria, Illinois opposed the bill, but O'Neill delivered a Peoria broadcast showing how the bill would fix various infrastructure problems in Peoria. Matthews wrote that "by hitting his rival where he lived, O'Neill translated a wholesale debate over national economic policy to the local, retail level."

== See also ==
- Country (identity)
- Parochialism
- Pork barrel
