= Parochialism =

Focus on small sections of an issue

Parochialism is the state of mind whereby one focuses on small sections of an issue rather than considering its wider context. More generally, it consists of being narrow in scope. In that respect, it is a synonym of "provincialism". It may, particularly when used pejoratively, be contrasted to cosmopolitanism. The term insularity (related to an island) may be similarly used to connote limited exposure.

== History ==
The term originates from the idea of a parish (Late Latin: parochia), one of the smaller divisions within many Christian churches such as the Catholic, Eastern Orthodox, and Anglican churches.

Events, groups and decisions within a parish are based locally — sometimes taking little heed of what is going on in the wider Church. A parish can sometimes be excessively focused on the local scale (thus within a particular point of view), by having (too) little contact with the broader outside, showing meager interest for and possibly knowledge about the universal scale.

Subsidiarity is an organizing principle that matters ought to be handled by the smallest, lowest or least centralized competent authority. The Oxford English Dictionary defines subsidiarity as the idea that a central authority should have a subsidiary function, performing only those tasks which cannot be performed effectively at a more immediate or local level.

== Usage ==
The term "parochial" can be applied in both culture and economics if a local culture or geographic area's government makes decisions based on solely local interests that do not take into account the effect of the decision on the broader community. The term may also be applied to decisions and events that are considered to be trivial in the grand scheme of things but that may be overemphasized in a smaller community, such as disputes between neighbors.

=== In politics ===
Parochialism can be found around the world and has sometimes been acknowledged by local institutions. For example, in a change of curriculum on February 7, 2007, Harvard University said that one of the main purposes of the major curriculum overhaul (the first in three decades) was to overcome American "parochialisms", referring in this case to a national point of view rather than one concerned with any particular small community.

The political principle of localism is that which supports local production and consumption of goods, local control of government, and local culture and identity. Localist politics have been approached from many directions by different groups. Nevertheless, localism can generally be described as related to regionalism, and in opposition to centralism.

As an Irish pejorative, the term parish pump politics is used to describe political activity that is more evidently concerned with addressing the immediate needs of the local electorate than with strategy that might affect their long-term well-being.

== Cosmopolitanism versus parochialism ==
In 1969 Everett Carll Ladd published Ideology in America – his study of political attitudes in the Greater Hartford, Connecticut area. For context, he introduced the "conventional dichotomy" of liberal versus conservative in political thought, and contrasts this with an alternative dimension of cosmopolitanism versus parochialism. Ladd acknowledges the anticipation by Robert Merton of this localist versus cosmopolitan dichotomy.

Ladd describes a parochial leader in terms of their largely local attachments:

They are, typically, small businessmen and locally oriented professionals who have spent all or most of their lives in the community and whose horizons and connections are narrow and limited to it. Their orthodoxies – partly due to less formal training and partly because of their associations and contacts – are the older "prescientific" ones. They have influence not because of expertise or controlling positions in major corporate structures, but because of personal characteristics – their friendships and associations with common men (typically as voters) in the community. They reflect the hostility of their marginally "have" constituents to demands for change which threaten their economic position or social status.

He makes clear that he does not demonize the adherents of parochialism:

There will be a strong temptation to draw from my construction a picture of Parochials as the bad guys of the new ideological struggle. This is not intended. The response of Parochials probably is as "reasonable", given their sociopolitical position, as is that of Cosmopolitans in light of theirs. What I have tried to suggest is that however humanely inclined they may be as individuals, Hartford Parochials are fundamentally "reactionary", reacting against a new orthodoxy, a new expertise, a new complexity, and for them a new and diminished status. Parochialism is a "reactionary" ideology in a civilisation texchnicienne, one that has muffled traditional economic tensions, accumulated scientific knowledge about agonizing social problems, and acquired a staggering body of technical expertise.

The dichotomy between parochialism and cosmopolitanism, as well as provincialism and cosmopolitanism, has been challenged in recent debates aimed at highlighting the empowering value of the parochial and the local.

== See also ==
- All politics is local
- Country (identity)
- Groupthink
- Intellectual inbreeding
- Localism
- Nationalism
- NIMBY
- Parochial school
- Pork barrel
- Tunnel vision (metaphor)
- Xiaonong Yishi
- Parochial altruism
