= Parochial altruism =

In-group aid, with out-group hostility

Parochial altruism is a concept in social psychology, evolutionary biology, and anthropology that describes altruism towards an in-group, often accompanied by hostility towards an out-group. It is a combination of altruism, defined as behavior done for the benefit of others without direct effect on the self, and parochialism, which refers to having a limited viewpoint. Together, these concepts create parochial altruism, or altruism which is limited in scope to one's in-group. Parochial altruism is closely related to the concepts of in-group favoritism and out-group discrimination. Research has suggested that parochial altruism may have evolved in humans to promote high levels of in-group cooperation, which is advantageous for group survival. Parochial altruism is often evoked to explain social behaviors within and between groups, such as why people are cooperative within their social groups and why they may be aggressive towards other social groups.

== History ==
The concept of parochial altruism was first suggested by Charles Darwin. In his book, "The Descent of Man," Darwin observed that competition between a group of the same species and cooperation within groups were important evolutionary traits that influenced human behavior. While Darwin first described the general concept of parochial altruism, the term was first coined in 2007 by economists Jung-Kyoo Choi and Samuel Bowles.

Following Darwin's initial theories, modern researchers in fields such as evolutionary biology and social psychology began investigating the evolution of group dynamics and altruism. Bowles and fellow economist Herbert Gintis proposed a co-evolution between warfare and in-group altruism.

In addition to this work on evolution, a set of influential studies conducted with indigenous groups in Papua New Guinea were major contributions to the study of parochial altruism. These studies demonstrated how social norms and behaviors surrounding cooperation are often shaped by parochialism. Specifically, these altruistic behaviors were found to be limited to one's own ethnic, racial, or language group. This work revealed that individuals were more likely to protect members of their in-group, even if it required aggression to out-group members.

== Definition and characteristics ==
Parochial altruism refers to a form of altruistic behavior that is exhibited preferentially towards members of one's own group, often accompanied by hostility towards those outside the group. This phenomenon is characterized by a combination of "in-group love" and "out-group hate". The preference towards one's in-group often manifests as cooperation with and sacrifice for members of the same social, ethnic, or cultural group. By contrast, hostility towards an out-group often manifests as aggression and discrimination towards members of different social groups. Parochial altruism is distinct from more general altruism, which is characterized as behavior done to benefit another individual, with no benefit to the self. The balance between preferential treatment towards an in-group and hostility towards an out-group is important for understanding intergroup dynamics.

More broadly, altruism can manifest in different forms, ranging from small acts of kindness, like helping a stranger or a friend in need, to more significant sacrifices, such as donating an organ to save another's life. Evolutionary biologists, ethologists, and psychologists have investigated the roots of altruism, suggesting that it may have evolved as a means of enhancing the survival of one's kin (kin selection) or as a strategy to receive a reciprocal benefit from another individual (the norm of reciprocity). Cultural and societal norms significantly influence altruistic behavior, as evidenced by the diversity of altruistic norms and expressions across different human societies. Altruism is often contrasted with ethical egoism, the view that individuals should act in their own self-interest. The complexity of human motivation makes the distinction between altruism and self-interest difficult to identify, and this is an ongoing debate within psychology and philosophy alike.

== Evolutionary theories ==
=== Kin Selection Theory ===
Kin selection is a theory in evolutionary biology that may offer a foundational framework to help explain the mechanisms underlying parochial altruism. In 1964, evolutionary biologist William Donald Hamilton proposed a theory and mathematical formula, commonly referred to as Hamilton's Rule. The rule posits that evolutionary processes may favor altruistic behaviors when they benefit close genetic relatives, thereby indirectly promoting the transmission of shared genes. Hamilton's Rule is described by the formula C < r × B, where C represents the cost to the altruist, r is the genetic relatedness between the altruist and the receiver, and B is the benefit to the receiver. In essence, kin selection suggests that individuals are more likely to perform altruistic acts if the cost to themselves is outweighed by the benefit to their relatives. In the context of parochial altruism, kin selection provides a compelling explanation for the preference for in-group favoritism. It suggests that individuals may be evolutionarily predisposed to exhibit altruistic behaviors towards members of their own group, especially if those group members are close genetic relatives.

=== Reciprocity ===
The norm of reciprocity states that people tend to respond to others in the same way that they have been treated. For example, kind and altruistic behavior will be responded to with more kind and altruistic behavior, while unkind and aggressive behavior will be responded to with more unkind and aggressive behavior. This principle, central to the theory of reciprocal altruism introduced by Robert Trivers in 1971, suggests that altruistic behaviors within a group are reciprocated, thereby reinforcing group cohesion and mutual support. This idea has been applied to group cooperation, which suggests that reciprocity is evolutionarily advantageous, particularly in the context of an in-group. Reciprocal altruism extends beyond kin selection, as it benefits individuals based on their previous actions, not just genetic relatedness. Reciprocity has been observed in a wide range of species, indicating its evolutionary advantage in fostering cooperation among non-kin group members. In the context of parochial altruism, the expectation of reciprocity fosters social connection and a sense of mutual obligation that is preferential to the in-group.

=== Co-evolution with war ===
Evolutionary theorists have suggested that the human capacity for altruism may have co-evolved with warfare. This theory argues that in-group altruism, a core component of parochial altruism, would have increased chances of success in warfare. Groups who were willing to sacrifice for each other would be more cohesive and cooperative, thus conferring advantages in warfare. Ultimately, greater success in warfare would lead to greater genetic success. Conversely, the pressures and demands of warfare may have intensified the need for in-group altruism and exacerbated parochialism. This process may have led to a bidirectional relationship between warfare and parochial altruism, with each element reinforcing the other. The idea of war and altruism being intricately interconnected may also help explain the high frequency of intergroup conflicts observed in ancient human societies.

=== Group Selection Theory ===
The idea of parochial altruism may seem counterintuitive from an individual selection theory, given that parochialism is often dangerous to the individual. To explain this, theorists often reference group selection theory, which suggests that natural selection operates at the group level, not just among individuals. Specifically, behavior that is beneficial to a group, even if it is costly to an individual, may be selected because it increases the overall survival chances and genetic success of a group. Group selection theory suggests that individual behaviors and decisions may be shaped by the needs of the group. For example, an individual may choose to sacrifice themselves by attacking an out-group, if they perceive a benefit to their in-group. This theory has faced considerable criticism and is not universally accepted in the field.

== Third party punishment ==
Third Party Punishment is a phenomenon that occurs when an individual, who was not directly affected by a transgression, punishes the transgressor. This form of punishment is influential in maintaining social order and reinforcing group norms, even if it incurs personal cost to the punisher. Third party punishment is an integral component of enforcing social norms among societies. Research on parochial altruism often employs third-party punishment experiments, whereby individuals are more likely to protect norm violators from their in-groups, and punish those from an out-group. This bias in third party punishment is a basis for parochial altruism. These experiments often use economic games, such as the dictator game or the prisoner's dilemma to measure punishment. Furthermore, researchers have identified neural mechanisms for social cognition that seem to specifically modulate third-party norm enforcement. The study illustrated that participants who were determining punishment for out-group members who have transgressed show greater activity and connectivity in a network of brain regions that modulate sanction-related decisions, while participants who were determining punishment for in-group members who have transgressed show greater activity and connectivity in brain regions that modulate mentalizing.

== Cross-cultural perspectives ==
Like many psychological phenomenon, parochial altruism may manifest uniquely across different cultural contexts. Research has revealed that cultures vary in both intensity and expression of in-group favoritism and out-group hostility. These differences are likely the result of norms, societal structures, and historical factors that vary among cultures. Joseph Henrich and colleagues conducted a large-scale research study examining cross-cultural variations in economic and dictator games in 15 small-scale societies. Their studies revealed that economic and social environments influence altruistic behavior towards in-group members. For example, they found that societies with a higher level of market integration and adherence to religion showed more fairness in economic games. This suggests that there is a moral component of altruism, that is influenced by culture and is distinct from the in-group and out-group model of parochial altruism. Additionally, theories about the coevolution of parochial altruism and war suggest that social structures and organization may play a role in shaping parochial altruism. Societies with strong clan or tribal affiliations, and particularly those with more frequent conflict, tend to exhibit more pronounced parochial altruism, reinforcing cooperation and unity within the social group. Historical and ecological factors may also influence the extent of parochial altruism within societies. In regions with a history of intergroup conflict or scare resources that must be fought over, groups may exhibit stronger in-group loyalty and out-group aggression as an adaptive response to the environment.

== Psychological and sociological implications ==
Parochial altruism influences both individual psychology and broader societal dynamics.

=== Individual psychology ===
Parochial altruism influences individual through its impact on social identity and perception. Social identity theory suggests that individuals derive a sense of self from their group memberships. Parochial altruism can reinforce a social identity when individuals behave more altruistically to their own one-group. Similarly, in-group favoritism and out-group hostility are central to parochial altruism, and shape how individuals perceive and interact with others. Individuals are more likely to view in-group members as trustworthy and likable, and view out-group members as suspicious and hostile. Thus, parochial altruism is an example of how group membership shapes individual attitudes and interpersonal dynamics.

=== Within-group relations ===
Parochial altruism influences within-group relations by fostering a sense of unity and cooperation among group members. This is achieved through the in-group favoritism that is characteristic of parochial altruism, whereby individuals selectively behave altruistically towards members of their own group. Research on social identity illustrates how these in-group biases reinforce a sense of shared identity and collective goals. Social identity theory further posits that enhanced group cooperation can increase group morale and self-esteem, strengthening the social bonds among group members.

=== Intergroup relations ===
Contrary to within-group relations, parochial altruism influences intergroup relations through increased tension and conflict between in-groups and out-groups. This is driven by the out-group hostility component of parochial altruism, where individuals are more likely to punish out-group members and treat them with aggression when compared with in-group members. Research illustrates that these out-group biases that are characteristic of parochial altruism can lead to prejudice, discrimination, and intergroup conflict. While parochial altruism strengthens group cohesion within one's in-group, it also fosters conflict with out-groups.

== Animal models ==
The study of parochial altruism extends beyond human societies, with various animal models providing insight into the evolutionary origins and mechanisms of this behavior. In the animal kingdom, parochial altruism has been observed within the context of territorial defense and resource allocation within social groups. For example, chimpanzees have been observed to exhibit behaviors that mirror human parochial altruism, such as defending their group's territory against outsiders and favoring group members in food-sharing and grooming practices. These behaviors are directed towards enhancing the survival of in-group members, similar to the in-group favoritism and out-group hostility characteristic of human parochial altruism. Similar behavior has been observed in vampire bats, who demonstrate reciprocal altruism within their social groups by sharing meals with kin and non-kin group members, but not with other bats.

== Criticism and controversy ==
While the concept of parochial altruism has been influential in explaining social behaviors like in-group altruism and out-group hostility, it has also received criticism. Specifically, the evolutionary basis of parochial altruism has been questioned for the theory's reliance on group selection. Group selection posits that natural selection operates at the group level, favoring traits that are beneficial for the group rather than the individual. This concept contrasts the traditional and more scientifically backed view of Darwinian selection, which occurs at the individual level and promotes traits beneficial to individual organisms. This debate over group selection is a longstanding issue in evolutionary biology, and the group selection theory has faced critiques from scientists such as Richard Dawkins and Steven Pinker, who argue that there is not sufficient evidence to support the theory. An alternative theory, multi-level selection, was proposed by David Sloan Wilson and Elliott Sober as a modern interpretation of group selection.

Field studies on parochial altruism during conflict have also illustrated the need for a more nuanced understanding of parochial altruism. Researchers conducted studies before, during, and after riots in Northern Ireland, investigating how the conflict influenced real-world measures of cooperation, such as charity and school donations. The findings revealed that conflict was associated with reductions in all types of altruism, including both in-group and out-group, challenging the notion that inter-group conflict unconditionally promotes parochial altruism. Instead, they suggest that conflict may lead to a reduction in all types of cooperation. Critics have argued that the co-evolution of war and altruism is an oversimplification, which also fails to explain peaceful interactions between groups, defensive strategies, and sex differences in parochial altruism.

== Future directions ==
Emerging research seeks to investigate the neural basis of parochial altruism, using modern technologies such as neuroimaging and neurobiological approaches. Studies utilizing functional magnetic resonance imaging (fMRI) have identified specific brain regions that are activated during in-group versus out-group interactions, indicating a potential neural basis for parochial decision-making. Other research studies have examined how neuroendocrine factors, such as oxytocin and testosterone, may influence in-group favoritism and out-group hostility. A study by De Dreu et al. demonstrated that intranasal administration of oxytocin increased in-group trust and cooperation, as well as aggression toward perceived out-group threats. Other studies have illustrated that testosterone is associated with parochial altruism in humans and may modulate the neural systems associated with it. The intersection of neuroscience and social psychology (often referred to as social neuroscience or social cognitive neuroscience), offers a fertile ground for advancing the study of parochial altruism.

== See also ==
- Altruism
- In-group and out-group
- In-group favoritism
- Social identity theory
- Cooperation
- Kin Selection
- Reciprocal Altruism
- Group Selection
- Evolutionary game theory
- Moral Psychology
- Intergroup Relations
- Reciprocal Altruism
