= Third-party punishment =

Third-party punishment is punishment of a transgressor (first party) which is administered, not by a victim of the transgression (second party), but rather by a third party not directly affected by the transgression. It has been argued that third-party punishments are the essence of social norms, as they are an evolutionarily stable strategy, unlike second-party punishments. It has also been shown that third-party punishments are exhibited in all examined populations, though the magnitude of the punishments varies greatly, and that costly punishment co-varies with altruistic behavior. Differences between within-group and inter-group altruistic punishments have also been observed.

== Experimental evidence ==
Some of the common experiments in experimental economics concerning the study of second-party punishments with respect to distribution and cooperation norms have been dictator games and prisoner's dilemma games. These games can also be effectively used in the study of third-party punishments with respect to distribution and cooperation norms with some modifications.

=== Third-party dictator game ===
Concerning third-party dictator game (TP-DG), the game was modified to include a third person with a punishment option between the dictator and the recipient. The dictator was given an endowment of 100, of which he could choose to share any portion with the recipient. The third person observer was also given an endowment of 50, of which he could choose to spend in order to punish the dictator. If self-interest was the driving force for the decision making, then the dictator would choose to donate none of his endowment, and the third party observer would choose to spend none of his endowment punishing the dictator. However, roughly 60% of the third party observers chose to punish dictators who donated less than half their endowment.

In a variation of the TP-DG, the third party observer could choose to spend part of the endowment to punish the dictator or could spend part of the endowment to compensate the recipient. About 40% of the third party observers chose to do both, while 32% chose to compensate the recipient and only about 6% opted to punish only. This indicates that compensation is preferred over punishment in the TP-DG when an offer is perceived as unfair. This suggests that third-party punishment may be motivated by a desire to both provide justice for those who have been wronged and to reprimand those who violate expected social norms.

=== Third-party prisoner's dilemma ===
Concerning third-party prisoner's dilemma (TP-PD), the game was modified so that in addition to two players who would choose to either cooperate or defect, a third party observer could choose to punish the players. The payoffs of the game were such that the players would be best off if they defected; however, if both players chose to defect, their payoff would be less than if they had cooperated. The observer could then choose to spend from his endowment to punish the defectors who chose to put self-interest ahead of cooperation. From previous theories, it can be concluded that subjects are willing to cooperate if the probability that others will also do so is sufficiently large. Once again, if self-interest was the decision maker for these players, neither would choose to cooperate, and the observer would also choose to keep his full endowment and not issue any punishments. However, about 45.8% of observers chose to punish the defector when he is paired with a cooperator, and 20.8% chose to punish both players if they had both defected. It's important to note that the magnitude of punishment was much larger when one defected.

=== Second-party vs. third-party punishments ===
With respect to the distribution norms violations (dictator games), it has been shown that second-party punishments are consistently higher than third-party punishments for dictators that choose to share less than half of their endowment. The punishments were such that the dictators could still profit from giving less than half in the third-party conditions, but could not profit in the second-party conditions. The levels of punishment were consistently low for both second and third-party punishments if the levels of endowment were higher than half.

With respect to the cooperation norms violations (prisoner's dilemma), it has been shown that second-party punishments are consistently higher than third-party punishments for defectors. The punishments were such that the defectors could still profit in the third-party conditions, but could not profit in the second-party conditions. Punishment for cooperators were negligible under both conditions.

== Evolution and neural basis ==
Current evolutionary models state that human altruism evolved through the selective (cultural or biological) extinction of groups in inter-group conflicts. However, there is also evidence for altruism and norms between groups. Some models suggest that third party punishment of "free-riders" (those who do not cooperate) leads to increased group cooperation due to individual selection for cooperative traits.

When subjects were examined with a PET scan while playing a second-party trust game with another player, it was shown that when they administered punishment, the dorsal striatum, an area of the brain associated with the processing of rewards as a result of goal-directed actions, was activated. It was also shown that individuals with stronger activations of the dorsal striatum were willing to incur greater cost in order to punish the norm violator. This suggests that the people that administrated punishment against norm violators derived satisfaction from the act.

FMRI has also been used to examine third-party punishment. Subjects participated in a TP-DG during the scan as either a second party recipient or a third party observer. The nucleus accumbens, a brain region associated with reward, had punishment-related activation for both the second-party and third-party punishment conditions. The overall pattern of activation was consistent between the two conditions, though activation was stronger in the second party recipients. This suggests that second-party and third-party punishment decisions have a common neural basis.

== Cross-culture variations ==
It has been shown that altruistic punishment exists across many examined populations, but that there is also a large variance between them. Data gathered from 15 different populations showed that when participating in TP-DG, all societies showed a decreasing frequency of punishment as the dictator's offer approached 50%. There was, however, a large variance between societies as to how much of their endowment the observers were willing to pay in order to punish the dictator. These variances were not attributed to economic and demographic variables. It was also found that societies with high degrees of punishment also exhibit more altruistic behavior. Other studies have suggested that people in larger, more complex societies engage in significantly more third-party punishment than people in small-scale societies.

== Gender and age differences ==
Women have been found to contribute more in dictator games and also to be more likely to accept an offer than men, rather than to reject an offer to punish the dictator. This was found for second-party punishment experiments but has not been observed in studies examining third-party punishment. In mock trial experiments studying third-party punishment using legal scenarios, woman majority mock juries are more likely to convict than non-woman majority juries and are more likely to find a defendant guilty in a rape case. Men are more likely to be influenced by the attractiveness of the defendant than women.

There are significant differences in third-party punishment behavior between age groups. In a variation of the TP-DG, 8-year-olds based their punishment on the outcome of the unfair result and did not consider the intention of the actor in both second-party and third-party punishment decisions. Adolescents integrated the outcome and the intention when making second- but not third-party punishment decisions. Adults integrated the outcome and the intention of the act for both second- and third-party punishment. This demonstrates developmental differences in how third-party punishment decisions are made.

== Parochial altruism ==
Parochial altruism refers to altruism that is directed in a preferential manner towards members of one's own social group. In order to examine this effect, a study examined the outcomes of TP-DG experiments carried out in between two Papua New Guinea indigenous groups. The games had 4 conditions, which included: players A (dictator), B (recipient), and C (observer) all from the same group; only A and B from the same group; only A and C from the same group; only B and C from the same group. Current behavioral theories state that norms are emergent from interactions within groups, and therefore, outsiders don't obey the norm nor benefit from the altruistic behavior the norm enforces. This theory would therefore predict that no punishment will occur in any of the cases except for the ABC treatment condition. However, it was found that punishment was qualitatively similar in all 4 conditions, which suggests that egalitarian sharing norms exist within-groups and also between-groups.

It was observed that, while all 4 conditions exhibited egalitarian sharing norms, punishments were much higher in the ABC and BC conditions. This suggests that victims are more protected if the third-party observer belongs to same group as them. It was also found that the dictators expected much harsher punishments if third-party observers belonged to the same group as the victim. It was also found that transfers were higher in groups with the same A and B members, and lower in groups with the same A and C members, suggesting that the dictators expected leniency from third-party observers of their own group.

== See also ==
- Altruism
- Behavioral economics
- Dual inheritance theory
- Experimental economics
- Game theory
- Juries
- Neuroeconomics
- Norm (social)
