= Tunnel vision (metaphor) =

Philosophical metaphor

Tunnel vision is a collection of common heuristics and logical fallacies that lead individuals to focus on cues that are consistent with their opinion and filter out cues that are inconsistent with their viewpoint. The phenomenon is a metaphor for the medical condition of the same name (tunnel vision). It is mostly widely observed and researched in the field of criminology due to its prevalence and dangerous potential to create incorrect convictions.

Tunnel vision is related to confirmation bias, the over-reliance on external sources that may be inaccurate yet supports an individual's opinion, whereas tunnel vision is over-reliance on internal information whilst ignoring correct external information.

The common way to solve this problem is a second opinion, that is, getting somebody unrelated to the original investigation to look at it from the beginning, without the same biases and preconceptions. This is generally due to bias from preceding incidents.

== Tunnel vision within the criminal justice system ==
Within the criminal justice system tunnel vision refers to the tendency of investigators and prosecutors to use heuristics to filter evidence in order to build a case for a suspect's conviction in a discriminatory manner. Importance is given to information that supports their original conclusion and inconsistent information is overlooked. This has been associated with the tendency of police investigators to presume guilt which has been shown to increase with experience and training.

Eitan Elaad, a professor at Ariel University, conducted a study in order to examine the effects of tunnel vision on Israeli police investigators and laypeople in hypothetical criminal investigation situations. Two scenarios of criminal incidents were combined with intelligence information that was either incriminating (supporting the suspect's guilt) or exonerating (supporting the suspect's innocence). Participants were asked to indicate their confidence in the suspect's innocence or guilt on an 11-point scale. Results showed that police investigators assigned higher confidence scores in the suspect's guilt than laypeople when both incriminating and exonerating evidence was presented. Investigators were more strongly influenced by tunnel vision than laypersons.

== Explanations ==
Dual inheritance theory states that the brain is constantly learning about the world, through a combination of genetics, the environment and individual experiences. Beliefs are formed either by inner sources such as experiences and deductions or by accepting external sources. Humans often form judgements based on little information and rely on heuristics instead of considering available information. Individuals may focus on a particular point of view that supports their needs due to the consistency principle – once someone has made a decision, they will continue to make similar choices which complement this decision. Individuals with tunnel vision will cling to existing beliefs and values and disregard new information which may challenge these beliefs.

Reichart suggests that tunnel vision is shaped by social influences and reinforced when investigators are part of a group who all share the same opinion. He further suggests that investigators adopt pre-existing frameworks into which crime scenarios are placed and are often seen to use cognitive shortcuts based on typical understandings of who the offender is likely to be. The Public Prosecution Service of Canada describes potential factors that contribute to tunnel vision within the criminal justice system such as when the offender is perceived as an outsider or minority, or when the investigator is subject to institutional pressures such as reaching an expected goal in a short amount of time.

Findley et al. provide multiple examples of tunnel vision within different criminal cases such as the case of Marvin Anderson. DNA testing served as evidence that Anderson did not commit the crime, however investigators chose to focus on him because the perpetrator had mentioned to the victim that he had a Caucasian girlfriend, and Anderson was the only black male that the police knew of who also had a Caucasian girlfriend. Findley et al. suggest that tunnel vision is partly an innate process and the product of multiple cognitive distortions that obstruct accuracy in what we perceive.

== Alternative expressions of tunnel vision ==
Although current research largely studies and demonstrates the effects of tunnel vision within the criminal justice system there are several alternative arenas in which its effects can be observed. This is particularly evident in behaviours which require the use of heuristic strategies ('focus') to cope with a large cognitive load ('pressure'). The phrase 'choking under pressure' has been used to refer to groups such as athletes or musicians when motor actions may be compromised and tunnel vision occurs due to stress, leading to narrow attention span and focus on internal thought processes.

Furuya et al. investigated the effects of tunnel vision on musicians. They administered a questionnaire consisting of 93 questions to 300 professional pianists which asked about physical, emotional and mental experiences when playing challenging pieces that were well-prepared, on stage in front of an audience. Respondents were asked to rate the severity of tunnel vision experienced when their desire for superior performance was maximal and outcomes were poorer than expected. Results demonstrated 8 factors characterising tunnel vision in musicians such as failure of memory recall and feeling rushed and out of body control. Phenomena such as the McGurk Effect and the Stroop Effect show how the brain is inclined to prioritise certain stimuli. A factor of tunnel vision is that the more threatening a stimulus is perceived to be, the more likely an individual will pay attention to it.

A final example from Sisk et al. investigated the effects of tunnel vision within the education system. Individuals with fixed mindsets may be more prone to experiencing tunnel vision. Someone with a fixed mindset may believe that human attributes such as intelligence are stable and not malleable. Sisk et al. investigated to what extent growth mindsets are important to academic achievement. Teachers integrated discussions concerning mind sets into class activities. 12% of effect sizes were significantly different from zero, indicating that students with low socioeconomic status benefitted from mindset interventions, and had significantly better academic achievement than students in control groups. The results supporting this claim were weak, yet they do provide evidence that tunnel vision exists amongst adolescents, concerning education.

== See also ==
- Cognitive bias
- Parochialism
- Reality tunnel
