= Xiaonong Yishi =

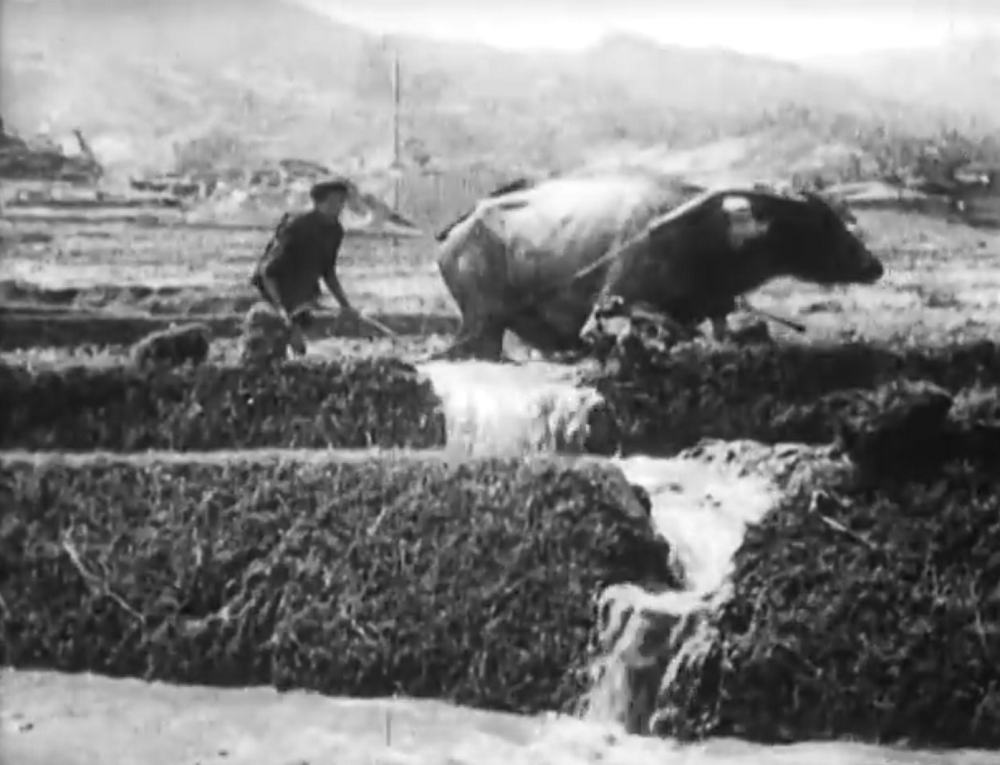
A Chinese peasant on the fields in the 1910s or 1920s.

Xiaonong Yishi (simplified Chinese: 小农意识; traditional Chinese: 小農意識; pinyin: Xiǎonóng yìshí; lit. 'petty peasant mentality') is a term used to describe parochialism originating from rural China, and which is related to the insular, traditional, and agrarian aspects of Chinese culture.

== Origins ==
The majority of people in Chinese history lived in a feudal society (Fengjian), which means that most people were peasants who owned a small amount of land. Long under centralized power, Chinese society is very much focused on tradition, order and authority, and on the family-based groups. Fei Xiaotong describes in From the Soil that "Villagers restrict the scope of daily activities; they do not travel far; they seldom make contact with the outside world; they live solitary lives; they maintain their own isolated social circle." In this context, the term has been loosely defined by Chinese social scientists as a multidimensional concept that refers to a cultural psyche that is closed-minded, conservative and restrained, and fearful of competition.

There are many accounts of this isolation of farmers from since the 20th century. A "mental hurdle" described by Mao Zedong, It has been documented by literary works such as Pearl S. Buck's The Good Earth and Lu Xun's Medicine and The True Story of Ah Q. A sense of collectivism has also been noted, however, it is confined to the family or a particular group and there is a lack of concern for the situation outside the family. Fei Xiaotong explains the situation in terms of the "differential mode of association", which is antithetical to the "organizational mode of association" in the West.

== Analysis ==
Yuan Yingchuan, Yan Hairong and Zhang Yong argue that the mentality has an element of "absolute egalitarianism", citing peasant revolts and "equality before the emperor". However, Feng and others challenge their claim, arguing that it is more a form of rural authoritarianism than egalitarianism. Feng also uses the term to explain behaviours in Chinese and American cultural differences that cannot be explained by Geert Hofstede's cultural dimensions theory.

Although Chinese society has changed considerably since the 1911 revolution and the communist revolution, even if in decline, the mentality is still considered to be rooted in Chinese society. Huang and Ng observe that the mentality may be affecting migrant workers and labor relations in China.

== See also ==
- Agriculture in China
- Asiatic mode of production
- Culture of the Southern United States
- Role ethics
- Small holding
- The Eighteenth Brumaire of Louis Bonaparte
