= Country (identity) =

Concept of country as part of one's identity

The concept of country, as an identity or descriptive quality, varies widely across the world, although some elements may be common among several groups of people.

== Rurality ==
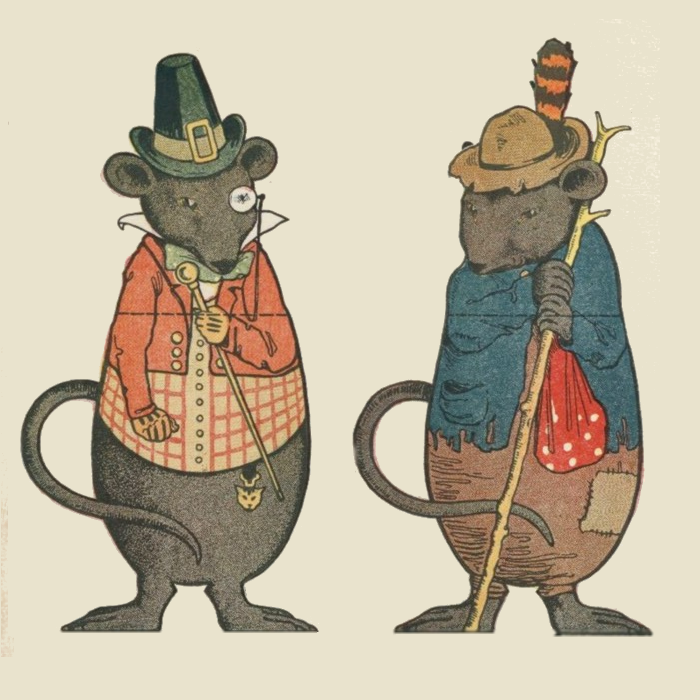
An illustration of "The Town Mouse and Country Mouse" of Aesop's Fables, an early parable of urban and rural equality/divide

One interpretation is the state or character of being rural, regardless of environment. It can be at direct odds with quantitative measures of rurality such as those used by governments for statistical analysis (which are often vague and poorly defined). "Country" in this sense is subjective and often intuitive. It encompasses a broad base of ideas and perceptions that may differ at local, regional or national levels.

=== Social development ===
Identity is often localized within relatively isolated populations which, having distinct traditions of their own, can often be viewed as an outgroup and marginalized by the dominant culture. Contrast between rural and urban realities not only produces measurable differences politically and economically, but also affects populations in terms of social identification. Country conceptualization shifts the focus away from the prevailing forces in society (usually centered in larger, metropolitan regions) and towards those on the periphery of society in remote areas and small towns. This transition causes rural populations to feel better connected with rural diaspora and more empowered. This conceptualization also highlights that rural culture does not necessarily depend on residing in a rural area, and may assist in reversing negative psychological consequences of marginalization.

=== Cognitive definitions ===
Country is a subjective state that perceives the rural experience as focal and inseparable to one's collective identity, regardless of location. This is often expressed in the demarginalization of ideas, values or lifestyles held as being representative of such a character, although a concise understanding of Country is difficult because the essential elements are perceived differently among individuals and groups. It is sometimes also limited by more specific classifications, such as "rural working-class culture" or "southern culture". It is thus better represented by its subjective symbolism, which recognises that individuals can continue to retain a sense of "ruralness" even in urbanized areas. As there is no definitive, scholarly consensus on precisely what constitutes Country, much of its discourse is manifested in the arts, and often described it in romanticized ways. Country music can be important tool for reinforcing this collective identity.

This emphasis of non-material culture over material culture resonates with the rural experience as being represented through material elements rather than solely consisting of them. Within the United States, country frequently transcends a close relationship with the Southern culture as a source of unity and empowerment of local, marginalized peoples who feel left out from the dominant culture. The preference to identify as country before more traditional means of classification, such as race or class, is reflected of self-determination theory. Country identification is one way in that an individual strives to better their association with others, by identifying in ways that are more advantageous to rural populations and not necessarily in ways dictated by mainstream society.

== See also ==
- Camp (Falkland Islands)
- Country (Indigenous Australians)
- Rurality, discussion of definitions
- Rurality Movement, an agrarianist political party in France
