= Rurality =

Property of rural societies

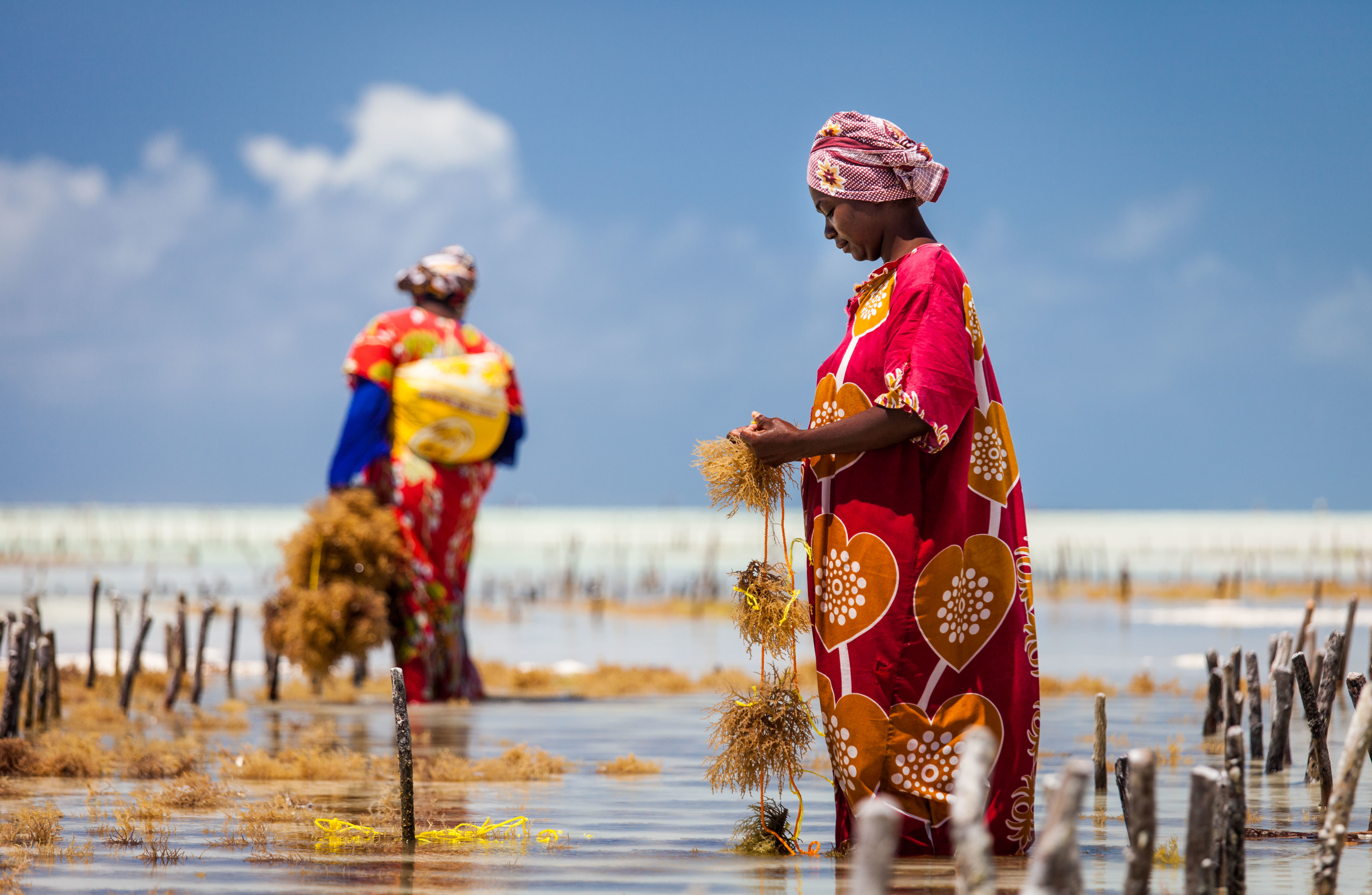
villagers harvesting seaweed - farming is often associated with rurality

Rurality is used as an expression of different rural areas as not being homogeneously defined. Many authors involved in mental health research in rural areas stress the importance of steering clear of inflexible blanket definitions of rurality (Philo, Parr & Burns 2003), and to instead "select definitions of rurality that are appropriate to the study being conducted".(Cloke 1977) One of the simplest, but clearest definition of rurality is that one that expresses rurality as "a condition of place-based homeliness shared by people with common ancestry or heritage and who inhabit traditional, culturally defined areas or places statutorily recognized to be rural".(Chigbu 2013, p. 815).

There is no single definition or measurement of rurality. It is often based on population size, population density, or geographical proximity to urban areas. Measurements of rural vary, ranging from populations of 2,500 to 50,000.

The index developed by Cloke (1977) categorises all areas of England and Wales into four criteria: extreme rural, intermediate rural, intermediate non-rural and extreme non-rural; as well as urban areas. He used 16 different ways of drawing the conclusions for his model, all of which led to the measure of an area's rurality.

== See also ==
- Deprivation index, measurements of poverty level
- Nordicity, degrees of northernness
- Rural health, study of health and healthcare delivery in rural environments
