= Intellectual inbreeding =

Practice in academia

Intellectual inbreeding or academic inbreeding is the practice in academia of a university hiring its own graduates who have not had experience as professors at any other universities. It is generally viewed as insular and unhealthy for academia. Intellectual inbreeding is thought to hinder the introduction of ideas from outside sources, just as genetic inbreeding hinders the introduction of new genes into a population.

The Commission on Graduate Education in Economics (COGEE) recognizes it as "a trend for emulation rather than diversification." Academic inbreeding has also been cited as a major problem in the major universities of the People's Republic of China—such as Peking University and Tsinghua University, which have adopted measures in recent years specifically to combat the practice—and South Korea. A relevant study also exists that analyzes the issue by considering Russia and Portugal as examples.
