= Generalized expected utility =

Generalized expected utility is a decision-making metric based on any of a variety of theories that attempt to resolve some discrepancies between expected utility theory and empirical observations, concerning choice under risky (probabilistic) or uncertain circumstances. Given its motivations and approach, generalized expected utility theory may properly be regarded as a subfield of behavioral economics, but it is more frequently located within mainstream economic theory.

The expected utility model developed by John von Neumann and Oskar Morgenstern dominated decision theory from its formulation in 1944 until the late 1970s, not only as a prescriptive, but also as a descriptive model, despite powerful criticism from Maurice Allais and Daniel Ellsberg who showed that, in certain choice problems, decisions were usually inconsistent with the axioms of expected utility theory. These problems are usually referred to as the Allais paradox and Ellsberg paradox.

Beginning in 1979 with the publication of the prospect theory of Daniel Kahneman and Amos Tversky, a range of generalized expected utility models were developed with the aim of resolving the Allais and Ellsberg paradoxes, while maintaining many of the attractive properties of expected utility theory. Important examples were anticipated utility theory, later referred to as rank-dependent utility theory, weighted utility (Chew 1982), and expected uncertain utility theory. A general representation, using the concept of the local utility function was presented by Mark J. Machina. Since then, generalizations of expected utility theory have proliferated, but the probably most frequently used model is nowadays cumulative prospect theory, a rank-dependent development of prospect theory, introduced in 1992 by Daniel Kahneman and Amos Tversky.
