= Anscombe-Aumann subjective expected utility model =

In decision theory, the Anscombe-Aumann subjective expected utility model (also known as Anscombe-Aumann framework, Anscombe-Aumann approach, or Anscombe-Aumann representation theorem) is a framework to formalizing subjective expected utility (SEU) developed by Frank Anscombe and Robert Aumann.

Anscombe and Aumann's approach can be seen as an extension of Savage's framework to deal with more general acts, leading to a simplification of Savage's representation theorem. It can also be described as a middle-course theory that deals with both objective uncertainty (as in the von Neumann-Morgenstern framework) and subjective uncertainty (as in Savage's framework).

The Anscombe-Aumann framework builds upon previous work by Savage, von Neumann, and Morgenstern on the theory of choice under uncertainty and the formalization of SEU. It has since become one of the standard approaches to choice under uncertainty, serving as the basis for alternative models of decision theory such as maxmin expected utility, multiplier preferences and choquet expected utility.

== Setup ==
=== Roulette lotteries and horse lotteries ===
The Anscombe-Aumann framework is essentially the same as Savage's, dealing with primitives $(\Omega, X, F, \succsim)$. The only difference is that now the set of acts $F$ consists of functions $f: \Omega \to \Delta (X)$, where $\Delta (X)$ is the set of lotteries over outcomes $X$.

This way, Anscombe and Aumann differentiate between the subjective uncertainty over the states $\Omega$ (referred to as a horse lottery), and the objective uncertainty given by the acts $f$ (referred to as roulette lotteries).

Importantly, such assumption greatly simplifies the proof of an expected utility representation, since it gives the set $F$ a linear structure inherited from $\Delta(X)$. In particular, we can define a mixing operation: given any two acts $f, g \in F$ and $\alpha \in [0,1]$, we have the act $\alpha f + (1-\alpha) g \in F$ define by

$(\alpha f + (1-\alpha) g) (\omega) = \alpha f (\omega) + (1-\alpha) g (\omega) \in \Delta (X)$

for all $\omega \in \Omega$.

=== Expected utility representation ===
As in Savage's model, we want to derive conditions on the primitives $(\Omega, X, F, \succsim)$ such that the preference $\succsim$ can be represented by expected-utility maximization. Since acts are now themselves lotteries, however, such representation involves a probability distribution $p \in \Delta (\Omega)$ and a utility function $u: X \to \mathbb R$ which must satisfy

$f \succsim g \iff \int_{\Omega} \mathop{\mathbb{E}}_{x \sim f(\omega)} \left[u(x)\right] \text{d}p(\omega) \geq \int_{\Omega} \mathop{\mathbb{E}}_{x \sim g(\omega)} \left[u(x)\right] \text{d}p(\omega).$

== Axioms ==
Anscombe and Aumann posit the following axioms regarding $\succsim$:

- Axiom 1 (Preference relation) : $\succsim$ is complete (for all $f, g \in F$, it's true that $f \succsim g$ or $g \succsim f$) and transitive.
- Axiom 2 (Independence axiom): given $f, g \in F$, we have that

$$f \succsim g \iff \alpha f + (1-\alpha) h \succsim \alpha g + (1-\alpha) h$$

for any $h \in F$ and $\alpha \in [0,1]$.

- Axiom 3 (Archimedean axiom): for any $f, g, h$ such that $f \succ g \succ h$, there exist $\alpha, \beta \in (0,1)$ such that

$$\alpha f + (1-\alpha) h \succ g \succ \beta f + (1-\beta) h.$$

For any act $f \in F$ and state $\omega \in \Omega$, let $f_{\omega} \equiv f(\omega)$ be the constant act with value $f(\omega)$.

- Axiom 4 (Monotonicity): given acts $f, g \in F$, we have

$$f_{\omega} \succsim g_{\omega} \text{ } \forall \omega \in \Omega \implies f \succsim g.$$

- Axiom 5 (Non-triviality): there exist acts $f, f' \in F$ such that $f \succ f'$.

== Anscombe-Aumann representation theorem ==
Theorem: given an environment $(\Omega, X, F, \succsim)$, the preference relation $\succsim$ satisfies Axioms 1-5 if and only if there exist a probability distribution $p \in \Delta(\Omega)$ and a non-constant utility function $u: X \to \mathbb R$ such that

$f \succsim g \iff \int_{\Omega} \mathop{\mathbb{E}}_{x \sim f(\omega)} \left[u(x)\right] \text{d}p(\omega) \geq \int_{\Omega} \mathop{\mathbb{E}}_{x \sim g(\omega)} \left[u(x)\right] \text{d}p(\omega)$

for all acts $f, g$. Furthermore, $p$ is unique and $u$ is unique up to positive affine transformations.

== See also ==
- Savage's subjective expected utility model
- von Neumann-Morgenstern utility theorem
