= Allais paradox =

Example of irrational preferences over lotteries

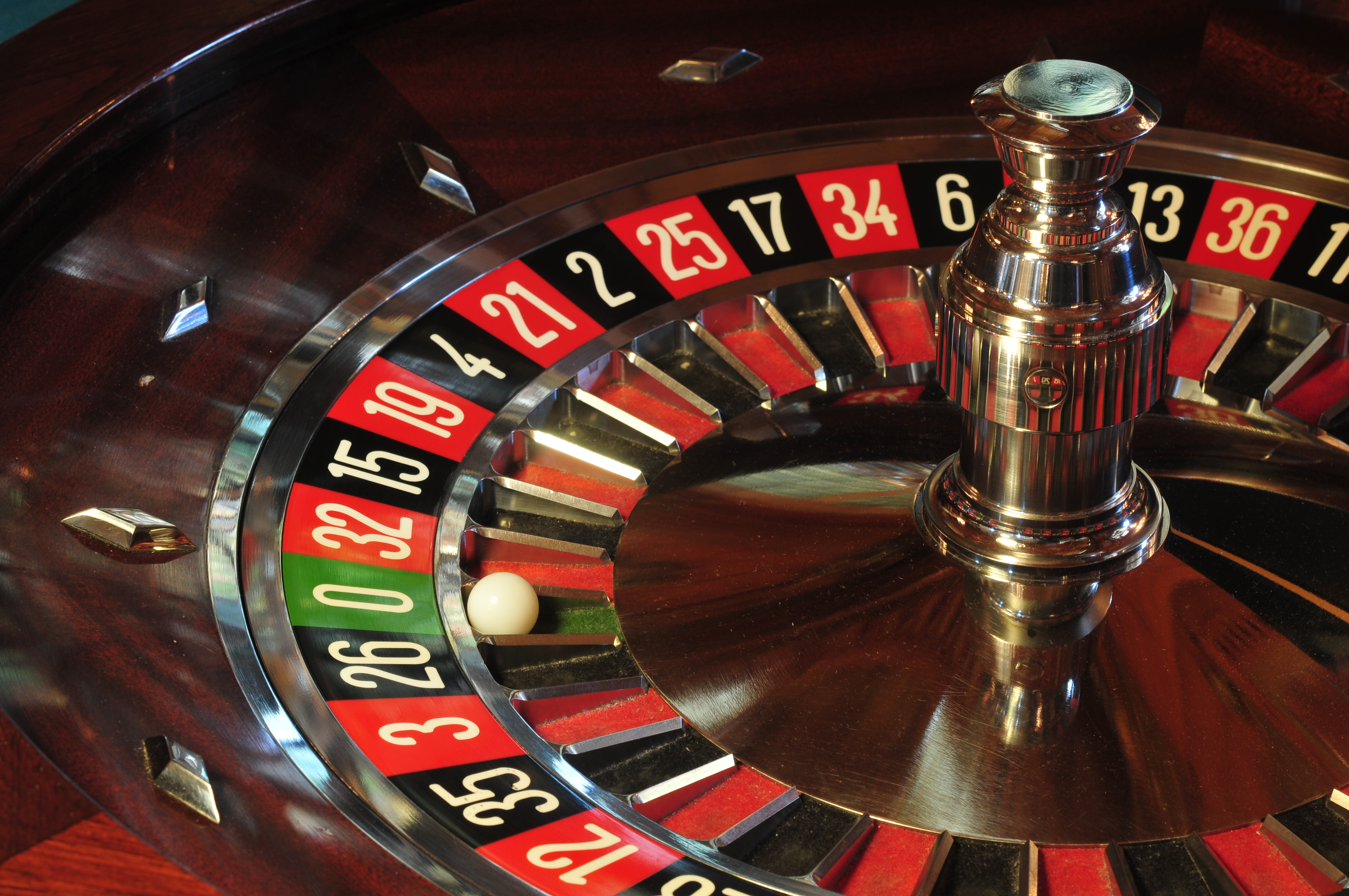
The Allais paradox is about a hypothetical gambling scenario. The paradox arises when comparing participants' choices in two different experiments, each of which consists of a choice between two gambles.

The Allais paradox is a choice problem designed by Maurice Allais in 1953 to show an inconsistency of actual observed choices with the predictions of expected utility theory. The Allais paradox demonstrates that individuals rarely make rational decisions consistently when required to do so immediately. The independence axiom of expected utility theory, which requires that the preferences of an individual should not change when altering two lotteries by equal proportions, was proven to be violated by the paradox.

== Statement of the problem ==
The Allais paradox arises when comparing participants' choices in two different experiments, each of which consists of a choice between two gambles, A and B. The payoffs for each gamble in each experiment are as follows:

Experiment 1				Experiment 2			
Gamble 1A		Gamble 1B		Gamble 2A		Gamble 2B	
Winnings	Chance	Winnings	Chance	Winnings	Chance	Winnings	Chance
$1 million	100%	$1 million	89%	Nothing	89%	Nothing	90%
$1 million	100%	Nothing	1%	$1 million	11%	Nothing	90%
$1 million	100%	$5 million	10%	$1 million	11%	$5 million	10%
$\mathbb{E}(\pi) = 1 \text{M}$$		$\mathbb{E}(\pi) = 1.39 \text{M}$$		$\mathbb{E}(\pi) = 0.11 \text{M}$$		$\mathbb{E}(\pi) = 0.5 \text{M}$$	

Several studies involving hypothetical and small monetary payoffs, and recently involving health outcomes, have supported the assertion that when presented with a choice between 1A and 1B, most people would choose 1A. Likewise, when presented with a choice between 2A and 2B, most people would choose 2B.

Allais further asserted that both of these preferences could be reasonable. Both B gambles have a 1% chance of getting a million dollars less than the corresponding A gamble, and a 10% chance of getting 4 million dollars more than the corresponding A gamble. If a person values money linearly, such that the next million dollars is always worth just as much to them as the previous million, then they should prefer both B gambles. But if a person values the first million more than 36 times as much as each of the next four millions, then they should prefer both A gambles.

However, there is no way of assigning values to money that enables a preference for 1A over 1B, and a preference for 2B over 2A, to simultaneously be compatible with expected utility theory. According to expected utility theory, the person should choose either 1A and 2A or 1B and 2B.

The inconsistency stems from the fact that in expected utility theory, equal outcomes added to each of two choices (e.g. the 89% chance of $1 million for both 1A and 1B over 2A and 2B) should have no effect on the relative desirability of one gamble over the other; equal outcomes should "cancel out". In each experiment the two gambles give the same outcome 89% of the time (starting from the top row and moving down, both 1A and 1B give an outcome of $1 million with 89% probability, and both 2A and 2B give an outcome of nothing with 89% probability). If this 89% 'common consequence' is disregarded, then in each experiment the choice between gambles will be the same – 11% chance of $1 million versus 10% chance of $5 million and 1% chance of nothing.

After re-writing the payoffs, and disregarding the 89% chance of winning — equalising the outcome — then 1B is left offering a 1% chance of winning nothing and a 10% chance of winning $5 million, while 2B is also left offering a 1% chance of winning nothing and a 10% chance of winning $5 million. Hence, choice 1B and 2B can be seen as the same choice. In the same manner, 1A and 2A can also be seen as the same choice, i.e.:

Experiment 1				Experiment 2			
Gamble 1A		Gamble 1B		Gamble 2A		Gamble 2B	
Winnings	Chance	Winnings	Chance	Winnings	Chance	Winnings	Chance
$1 million	89%	$1 million	89%	Nothing	89%	Nothing	89%
$1 million	11%	Nothing	1%	$1 million	11%	Nothing	1%
$1 million	11%	$5 million	10%	$1 million	11%	$5 million	10%

Allais presented his paradox as a counterexample to the independence axiom.

Independence means that if an agent is indifferent between simple lotteries $L_1$ and $L_2$, the agent is also indifferent between $L_1$ mixed with an arbitrary simple lottery $L_3$ with probability $p$ and $L_2$ mixed with $L_3$ with the same probability $p$. Violating this principle is known as the "common consequence" problem (or "common consequence" effect). The idea of the common consequence problem is that as the prize offered by $L_3$ increases, $L_1$ and $L_2$ become consolation prizes, and the agent will modify preferences between the two lotteries so as to minimize risk and disappointment in case they do not win the higher prize offered by $L_3$.

Difficulties such as this gave rise to a number of alternatives to, and generalizations of, the theory, notably including prospect theory, developed by Daniel Kahneman and Amos Tversky, weighted utility (Chew), rank-dependent expected utility by John Quiggin, and regret theory. The point of these models was to allow a wider range of behavior than was consistent with expected utility theory. Michael Birnbaum performed experimental dissections of the paradox and showed that the results violated the theories of Quiggin, Kahneman, Tversky, and others, but could be explained by his configural weight theory that violates the property of coalescing.

The main point Allais wished to make is that the independence axiom of expected utility theory may not be a valid axiom. The independence axiom states that two identical outcomes within a gamble should be treated as irrelevant to the analysis of the gamble as a whole. However, this overlooks the notion of complementarities, the fact your choice in one part of a gamble may depend on the possible outcome in the other part of the gamble. In the above choice, 1B, there is a 1% chance of getting nothing. However, this 1% chance of getting nothing also carries with it a great sense of disappointment if you were to pick that gamble and lose, knowing you could have won with 100% certainty if you had chosen 1A. This feeling of disappointment, however, is contingent on the outcome in the other portion of the gamble (i.e. the feeling of certainty). Hence, Allais argues that it is not possible to evaluate portions of gambles or choices independently of the other choices presented, as the independence axiom requires, and thus is a poor judge of our rational action (1B cannot be valued independently of 1A as the independence or sure thing principle requires of us). We don't act irrationally when choosing 1A and 2B; rather expected utility theory is not robust enough to capture such "bounded rationality" choices that in this case arise because of complementarities.

== Intuition behind the Allais paradox ==
=== Zero effect vs certainty effect ===
The most common explanation of the Allais paradox is that individuals prefer certainty over a risky outcome even if this defies the expected utility axiom. The certainty effect was popularised by Kahneman and Tversky (1979), and further discussed in Wakker (2010). The certainty effect highlights the appeal of a zero-variance lottery. Recent studies have indicated an alternate explanation to the certainty effect called the zero effect.

The zero effect is an adjustment to the certainty effect that states individuals will appeal to the lottery that doesn't have the possibility of winning nothing (aversion to zero). During prior Allais style tasks that involve two experiments with four lotteries, the only lottery without a possible outcome of zero was the zero-variance lottery, making it impossible to differentiate the impact these effects have on decision making. Running two additional lotteries allowed the two effects to be distinguished and hence, their statistical significance to be tested.

Experiment 1				Experiment 2				Experiment 3			
Gamble 1A		Gamble 1B		Gamble 2A		Gamble 2B		Gamble 3A		Gamble 3B	
Winnings	Chance	Winnings	Chance	Winnings	Chance	Winnings	Chance	Winnings	Chance	Winnings	Chance
$1 million	100%	$1 million	89%	Nothing	89%	Nothing	90%	$8 million	89%	$8 million	89%
$1 million	100%	Nothing	1%	$1 million	11%	Nothing	90%	$1 million	11%	$5 million	10%
$1 million	100%	$5 million	10%	$1 million	11%	$5 million	10%	$1 million	11%	Nothing	1%

From the two-stage experiment, if an individual selected lottery 1A over 1B, then selected lottery 2B over 2A, they conform to the paradox and violate the expected utility axiom. The third experiment choices of participants who had already violated the expected utility theory (in the first two experiments) highlighted the underlying effect causing the Allais Paradox. Participants who chose 3B over 3A provided evidence of the certainty effect, while those who chose 3A over 3B showed evidence of the zero effect. Participants who chose (1A,2B,3B) only deviated from the rational choice when presented with a zero-variance lottery. Participants who chose (1A,2B,3A) deviated from the rational lottery choice to avoid the risk of winning nothing (aversion to zero).

Findings of the six-lottery experiment indicated the zero effect was statistically significant with a p-value < 0.01. The certainty effect was found to be statistically insignificant and not the intuitive explanation individuals deviating from the expected utility theory.

== Mathematical proof of inconsistency ==
Expected utility theory predicts that a rational person's choices can be predicted using a utility function $U(W)$, where $W$ is "wealth". Specifically, it predicts that a person will choose the outcome that maximizes the expected value of $U(W)$:

=== Experiment 1 ===
$$U(\text{Gamble 1A}) = 1.00 * U(\$\text{1 M})$$

$$U(\text{Gamble 1B}) = 0.01 * U(\$\text{0 M}) + 0.89 * U(\$\text{1 M}) + 0.10 * U(\$\text{5 M})$$

Because the typical individual prefers 1A to 1B, we should be able to conclude that the expected utility of Gamble 1A is higher than that of Gamble 1B:

$$\begin{array}{rcl}
U(\text{Gamble 1B})    &<& U(\text{Gamble 1A}) \\
0.01 * U(\$\text{0 M}) + 0.89 * U(\$\text{1 M}) + 0.10 * U(\$\text{5 M})
&<&
1.00 * U(\$\text{1 M})
\end{array}$$

=== Experiment 2 ===
$$U(\text{Gamble 2A}) =
0.89 * U(\$\text{0}) + 0.11 * U(\$\text{1 M})$$

$$U(\text{Gamble 2B}) =
0.90 * U(\$\text{0}) + 0.10 * U(\$\text{5 M})$$

Because the typical individual prefers 2B to 2A, we should be able to conclude that the expected utility of Gamble 2B is higher than that of Gamble 2A:

$$\begin{array}{rcl}
U(\text{Gamble 2A}) &<& U(\text{Gamble 2B}) \\
0.89 * U(\$\text{0}) + 0.11 * U(\$\text{1 M})
&<&
0.90 * U(\$\text{0}) + 0.10 * U(\$\text{5 M})
\end{array}$$

=== Contradiction ===
However, the resulting inequalities are inconsistent, and cannot simultaneously be true.

Experiment 1 can be algebraically rearranged to arrive at

$$0.01 * U(\$\text{0 M}) + 0.10 * U(\$\text{5 M})
<
0.11 * U(\$\text{1 M})$$

Experiment 2 can be algebraically rearranged to arrive at

$$0.11 * U(\$\text{1 M}) < 0.01 * U(\$\text{0}) + 0.10 * U(\$\text{5 M})$$

Because these two statements are contradictory, there is no possible utility function which would explain this combination of preferences using expected utility theory.

== History ==
The Allais Paradox was first introduced in 1952, where Maurice Allais presented various choice sets to an audience of economists at Colloques Internationaux du Centre National de la Recherche Scientifique, an economics conference in Paris. Similar to the choice sets above, the audience provided decisions that were inconsistent with expected utility theory. Despite this result, the audience was not convinced of the validity of Allais's finding and dismissed the paradox as a simple irregularity. Regardless, in 1953 Allais published his finding of the Allais paradox in Econometrica, an economics peer-reviewed journal.

Allais' work was yet to be considered feasible in the field of behavioural economics until the 1980s. Table 1 demonstrates the appearance of the Allais paradox in literature, collected through JSTOR.

Table 1: Appearance of Allais paradox in literature
	'Allais' and 'Paradox'	'Allais paradox'
1950s	27	0
1960s	43	2
1970s	44	5
1980s	204	143
1990s	224	135
2000s	143	92
2010s	321	190

Historian, Floris Heukelom, attributes this unpopularity to four distinct reasons. Firstly, Allais's work had not been translated from French to English until 1979 when he produced Expected Utility Hypotheses and the Allais Paradox. This 700-page book consisted of five parts: Editorial Introduction The 1952 Allais Theory of Choice involving Risk, The neo-Bernoullian Position versus the 1952 Allais Theory, Contemporary Views on the neo-Bernoullian Theory and the Allais Paradox, Allais' rejoinder: theory and empirical evidence. Of these, various economists and researchers of relevant study backgrounds contributed, including economist and cofounder of the mathematical field of game theory, Oskar Morgenstern.

Secondly, the field of economics in a behavioural sense was scarcely studied in the 1950s and 60s. The Von Neumann-Morgenstern utility theorem, which assumes that individuals make decisions that maximise utility, had been proven 6 years prior to the Allais paradox, in 1947.

Thirdly, In 1979, Allais's work was noticed and cited by Amos Tversky and Daniel Kahneman in their paper introducing Prospect Theory, titled Prospect Theory: An Analysis of Decision under Risk. Critiquing expected utility theory and postulating that individuals perceive the prospect of a loss differently to that of a gain, Kahneman and Tversky's research credited the Allais paradox as the "best known counterexample to expected utility theory". Furthermore, Kahneman and Tversky's article became one of the most cited articles in Econometrica, thus adding to the popularity of the Allais paradox. The Allais Paradox was again presented in Tversky and Kahneman's Thinking, Fast and Slow (2011), a New York Times Best Seller.

Finally, Allais's prominence was further promoted when he received the Nobel Prize in Economic Sciences in 1988 for "his pioneering contributions to the theory of markets and efficient utilization of resources", thus bolstering the recognition of the paradox.

== Criticisms ==
Whilst the Allais paradox is considered a counterexample to expected utility theory, Luc Wathieu, Professor of Marketing at Georgetown University, argued that the Allais paradox demonstrates the need for a modified utility function, and is not paradoxical in nature. In A Critique of the Allais Paradox (1993), Wathieu contends that the paradox "does not constitute a valid test of the independence axiom" that is required in expected utility theory. This is because the paradox involves the comparison of preferences between two separate cases, rather than the preferences in one choice set.

== Applications ==
The mismatch between human behaviour and classical economics that is highlighted by the Allais paradox indicates the need for a remodelled expected utility function to account for the violation of the independence axiom. Yoshimura et al. (2013) modified the standard utility function proposed by expected utility theory, coined the "dynamic utility function", by including a variable that is dependent on the state of an individual. The findings of this experiment suggested that the switching of preferences apparent in the Allais paradox are due to the state of the individual, which include bankruptcy and wealth.

List & Haigh (2005) tests the appearance of the Allais paradox in the behaviours of professional traders through an experiment and compares the results with those of university students. By providing two lotteries similar to those used to prove the Allais paradox, the researchers concluded that those who were professional traders less frequently make choices that are inconsistent with expected utility, as opposed to students.

== See also ==
- Ellsberg paradox
- Priority heuristic
- Rabin's paradox
- St. Petersburg paradox
