= Uncertainty effect =

The uncertainty effect, also known as direct risk aversion, is a phenomenon in economics and psychology in which individuals value a risky prospect (such as a lottery with known probabilities) less than its worst possible outcome.

In the original study by Uri Gneezy, John A. List, and George Wu in 2006, participants were willing to pay $38 for a $50 gift card, but only $28 for a lottery ticket that would yield either a $50 or $100 gift card with equal probability.

This effect is considered to be a violation of "internality" (i.e., the proposition that the value of a risky prospect must lie somewhere between the value of that prospect’s best and worst possible realizations) which is central to prospect theory, expected utility theory, and other models of risky choice. Additionally, it has been proposed as an explanation for a host of naturalistic behaviors which cannot be explained by dominant models of risky choice, such as the popularity of insurance/extended warranties for consumer products.

== Origins ==
Research on the uncertainty effect was first formally conducted by Uri Gneezy, John A. List, and George Wu in the early 2000s, though it follows in the footsteps of a large body of work devoted to understanding decision making under risk. As their starting point, Gneezy, List, and Wu noted that most models of risky choice assume that when presented with a risky prospect individuals engage in a balancing exercise of sorts in which they compare the best possible outcomes they might realize to the worst possible outcomes they might realize (e.g., in a gamble that gives a 50-50 chance to win $500 or $1,000, individuals might compare these two outcomes to one another). Within this type of schema, individuals are also expected to weight the value (or utility) of each of these discrete outcomes in accordance with the probability that each will occur.

While expected utility theory and prospect theory differ in terms of how outcomes are evaluated and weighted, they both nonetheless rely upon what Gonzalez, List, and Wu term as the "internality axiom." This axiom specifically posits that the value of some risky prospect must lie between the value of that prospect's best and worst possible outcomes. Formally, for some risky prospect $L = (x, p, y)$ which offers $p$ probability of earning $x$ and $1-p$ probability of earning $y$ (where $x$ is strictly greater than $y$), individuals' elicited values for $x$, $y$, and $L$ should satisfy the following inequality: $V(x) \geq V(L) \geq V(y)$.

In a series of studies conducted by Gneezy, List, and Wu, and in follow-up work conducted by Uri Simonsohn (among others), individuals were repeatedly shown to violate this assumption. For example:

- In an initial laboratory study which compared the willingness to pay (WTP) values for an even chance at winning a $50 giftcard or a $100 giftcard to the values of a $50 or $100 giftcard in isolation (all restricted for use at a local bookstore), individuals were – on average – willing to pay $26.10 for the $50 giftcard, $45.00 for the $100 giftcard, but only $16.12 for the lottery
- In follow-up laboratory studies with a modified elicitation format, and which also compared items with different use cases (e.g., a $100 giftcard for use at a restaurant versus a $50 giftcard for use at a bookstore; a voucher which yielded a free meal for four at a restaurant versus a $50 giftcard for use at a bookstore; etc.), individuals ascribed lower WTP values to a lottery that yielded one of two positive outcomes with equal probability than they did to the relevant positive outcomes in isolation
- In a field study with experienced baseball card traders, individuals were willing to pay significantly less for a lottery that yielded either a low-value card or a high-value card with equal probability ($34.09) than they were for the low-value card ($52.72) or the high-value card ($65.02) in isolation

Within this body of work, the uncertainty effect was also shown to extend to choice and to consideration of delayed outcomes; it was also shown not to be a consequence of poorly comprehending the lottery.

Among other explanations, it has been proposed that the uncertainty effect might arise as a consequence of individuals experiencing some form of disutility from risk.

== Implications ==
In his follow-up work on the uncertainty effect (or, as he termed it, direct risk aversion), Simonsohn suggested that it might provide an explanation for certain types of responses to risk that cannot be explained by prospect theory and expected utility theory. One notable example is the widespread popularity of insurance for small-stakes and/or low-probability risks – e.g., warranties for consumer electronics, low-deductible insurance policies, and so on; dominant theories of risky choice do not predict that such products should be popular, and Simonsohn asserted that the uncertainty effect might help to explain why.

== Critiques and alternative explanations ==
In the years after Gneezy, List, and Wu published their findings, several other scholars asserted that the uncertainty effect was simply a consequence of individuals misunderstanding the lottery utilized in initial tests of the uncertainty effect. Such claims were partially refuted by Simonsohn, whose 2009 paper utilized revised lottery instructions, as well as several other successful replications of the uncertainty effect which were published in subsequent years.

Notably, however, in later work with Robert Mislavsky, Simonsohn suggested that the uncertainty effect might be a consequence of aversion to "weird" transaction features as opposed to some form of disutility from risk. These and other alternative explanations are briefly summarized below.

=== Aversion to lotteries ===
In work published in 2013, Yang Yang, Joachim Vosgerau, and George Loewenstein suggested that the uncertainty effect might in fact be understood as a framing effect. Specifically, they posited that the anomalies associated with the uncertainty effect might not arise as a consequence of distaste for/disutility from risk, but rather, as a consequence of the fact that in most experiments which successfully replicated the uncertainty effect certain outcomes were contrasted to risky prospects described as lotteries, gambles, and the like. As such, they posited that the effect might instead be described as an aversion to lotteries, or – as they term it – an aversion to "bad deals."

=== Aversion to "weird transactions" ===
Although Simonsohn initially proposed that the uncertainty effect might reflect a distaste for uncertainty, in later work he and colleague Robert Mislavsky instead explored the idea that adding "weird" features to a transaction might give rise to patterns which appeared consistent with the uncertainty effect. For example, they noted that internality violations may arise as a consequence of being averse to the notion of purchasing a coin flip or other gamble in order to obtain a gift card, rather than the uncertainty represented by the coin flip itself. In their work, Mislavsky and Simonsohn systematically explored this notion, and suggest that the aversion to weird transactions may help to provide a more parsimonious explanation for certain failures to replicate the uncertainty effect.

== See also ==
- Risk aversion (psychology)
