= Priority heuristic =

Decision strategy

The priority heuristic is a simple, lexicographic decision strategy that helps decide for a good option.

== Psychology ==
In psychology, priority heuristics correctly predict classic violations of expected utility theory such as the Allais paradox, the four-fold pattern, the certainty effect, the possibility effect, or intransitivities.

The heuristic maps onto Rubinstein’s three-step model, according to which people first check dominance and stop if it is present, otherwise they check for dissimilarity. To highlight Rubinstein’s model consider the following choice problem:

1. 50% chance to win $2,000 / 50% chance to win nothing
2. 52% chance to win $1,000 / 48% chance to win nothing

Dominance is absent, and while chances are similar monetary outcomes are not. Rubinstein’s model predicts that people check for dissimilarity and consequently choose Gamble I. Unfortunately, dissimilarity checks are often not decisive, and Rubinstein suggested that people proceed to a third step that he left unspecified. The priority heuristic elaborates on Rubinstein’s framework by specifying this Step 3.

=== Priority heuristic ===
For illustrative purposes consider a choice between two simple gambles of the type “a chance c of winning monetary amount x; a chance (100 - c) of winning amount y.” A choice between two such gambles contain four reasons for choosing: the maximum gain, the minimum gain, and their respective chances; because chances are complementary, three reasons remain: the minimum gain, the chance of the minimum gain, and the maximum gain.

For choices between gambles in which all outcomes are positive or 0, the priority heuristic consists of the following three steps (for all other choices see Brandstätter et al. 2006):

- Priority rule: Go through reasons in the order of minimum gain, the chance of minimum gain, and maximum gain.
- Stopping rule: Stop examination if the minimum gains differ by 1/10 (or more) of the maximum gain; otherwise, stop examination if chances differ by 10% (or more).
- Decision rule: Choose the gamble with the more attractive gain (chance). The term “attractive” refers to the gamble with the higher (minimum or maximum) gain and to the lower chance of the minimum gain.

=== Examples ===
Consider the following two choice problems, which were developed to support prospect theory, not the priority heuristic.

Problem 1

1. 80% chance to win $4,000 / 20% chance to win nothing
2. 100% chance to win $3,000

Most people (80%) chose B. The priority heuristic starts by comparing the minimum gains of the Gambles A ($0) and B ($3,000). The difference is $3,000, which is larger than $400 (10% of the maximum gain), the examination is stopped; and the heuristic predicts that people prefer the sure gain B, which is in fact the majority choice.^{A}

Problem 2

3. 45% chance to win $6,000 / 55% chance to win nothing
4. 90% chance to win $3,000 / 10% chance to win nothing

Most people (86%) chose Gamble D. The priority heuristic starts by comparing the minimum gains ($0 and $0). Because they do not differ, the probabilities (.45 and .90 or their logical complements .55 and .10) are compared. This difference is larger than 10%, examination stops and people are correctly predicted to choose D because of its higher probability of winning.

=== Empirical support and limitations ===
The priority heuristic correctly predicted the majority choice in all (one-stage) gambles in Kahneman and Tversky (1979). Across four different data sets with a total of 260 problems, the heuristic predicted the majority choice better than (a) cumulative prospect theory, (b) two other modifications of expected utility theory, and (c) ten well-known heuristics (such as minimax or equal-weight) did. However, the priority heuristic fails to predict many simple decisions (that are typically not tested in experiments) and has no free parameters (which means that it cannot explain the heterogeneity of decisions between subjects), which triggered criticism, and countercriticism.

== Production ==
In production, priority heuristics help optimize the execution of jobs, through scheduling.

== See also ==
- Single-machine scheduling
- Queueing theory
- Economics
- Combinatorics
