= Winner-take-all market =

Market type in economics

In economics, a winner-take-all market is a market in which a product or service that is favored over the competitors, even if only slightly, receives a disproportionately large share of the revenues for that class of products or services. It occurs when the top producer of a product earns a lot more than their competitors. Examples of winner-take-all markets include the sports and entertainment markets.

The distribution of rewards for different amounts of work determines the degree to which a market is considered winner-take-all. For example, most lottery games are 100% winner-take-all systems because one person takes the entire reward and the rest receive nothing. On the other hand, most manual work, such as picking apples, is the opposite of a winner-take-all system. In this apple-picking example, the reward is proportional to the amount picked — a person who picks only one box of apples still gets rewarded proportionally. There are also intermediate cases. For example, in Olympic competition, only the top three individuals or teams are rewarded with medals, but other finishers receive lesser rewards such as bragging rights and publicity.

Although some markets (such as lottery games) are designed to be winner-take-all, there are some markets that evolve to become winner-take-all. For example, the piano market was not winner-take-all before rail transportation, whose growing availability and popularity resulted in leading piano makers became progressively larger and capturing more of the piano market, while smaller competitors disappeared over time. (See the Matthew effect, in which "the rich get richer and the poor get poorer".)

The term "winner-take-all" as applied to economic markets was popularized by the 1996 book The Winner-Take-All Society: Why the Few at the Top Get So Much More Than the Rest of Us by Robert H. Frank and Philip J. Cook.

== Winner-take-all effect ==
The winner-take-all phenomenon, categorized by Frank and Cook, which describes the tendency in certain markets for rewards to skew heavily to “superstar” players despite small differences between their performance and that of alternatives.

Earnings distributions or payoff-structures in winner-take-all models differ from a standard human capital model, where earnings directly correlate to the capital produced per unit of worker time. In a winner-take-all market “small differences in human capital translate to large differences in economic reward”.

== Characteristics ==
Frank and Cook’s model describes a Winner-take-all market as one which is characterised by excessive entry and investment.

In winner take-all markets the magnitude of entrants has been found to be in excess of typical Nash equilibrium predictions. When compared with expected payoff-equivalent market games the winner-take all market induces more entry despite having the same expected payoff and greater variance. This effect contradicts predictions of expected utility models with risk aversion.

Cumulative prospect theory has been found to provide a more comprehensive explanation for the winner-take-all market than classical expected utility theory.

== Models ==
Frank and Cook model winner-take-all (WTA) markets under a variety of conditions.

They use an example of a two sector economy where one sector presents WTA characteristics. In this model the revenue reward function modelling $N$ number of players in the economy and $K$ number of players which are allocated to the winner take all market. In this case $V(K) = (N-K) E[v(K)]$ is used to predict the revenue $V$ available to WTA contestants as a function of expected reward $E[v(K)]$.

=== Unobservable Differences ===
In the simplest instance a WTA market where the differences between players are unobservable and therefore the probability of each player winning is perceived as equal. Finding for the simple two sector economy; output $GNP = V(K^e) + [N-\Bigl(\frac{V(K^e)}{w}\Bigr)]w = Nw$, similar to rent seeking models and dual labour market models for developing countries.

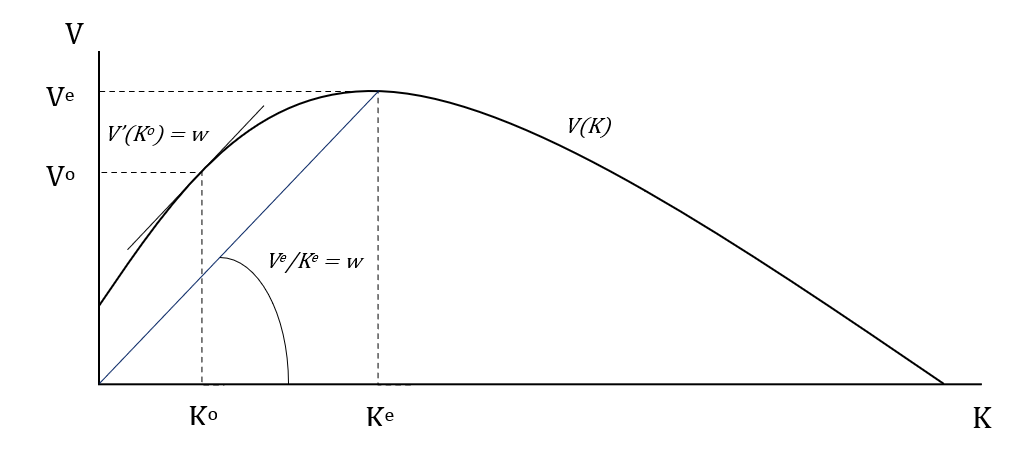
Private equilibrium versus social optimum in a winner-take all market

This model is used to demonstrate the inefficiencies of entry into the WTA market by contrasting these values with the socially optimal allocation $V'(K^o)=w$ showing the private equilibrium allocation in a WTA market outstrips the socially optimum allocation where output is maximised.

=== Observable Differences ===
To provide a more realistic model of the winner-take-all market – when differences in talent of the players are observable – meaning the perceived probability of each player winning varies. This model takes the factor Q which combines the selective factors $T$ talent and $U$ representing unobserved factors which influence quality such that $Q_i = T_i + U_i,$ $i = 1, \ldots, N$ for each player where $T_i$ and $U_i$ are variables determined from some distribution and drawn randomly for the $N$ players.

While in the model of unobservable differences the market reward $V$ increases with every additional WTA player $K+1$ , in this model the value of reward $V$ increases only where the quality of the new WTA player is higher than the lowest quality of the existing player pool. The probability of this event$p_1(K)$ then determines the marginal reward gain for new entrants $V(K)-V(K-1)=p_1(K)Z$

where $Z$ is the expected value gain if the new entrant wins. The model takes $Z=R_1 ^*-X$ where $R_1 ^*$ is the expected revenue gain and $X$ is a positive number as the expected gain in WTA market value is only a part of the revenue which will be received by the entrant upon winning.

This model finds that $p_1(K^o)R_1^*(K^o)=w+p_1(K^o)X$ which shows that the anticipated reward (left) to new entrants exceeds the opportunity wage $w$ by $p_1(K^o)X$. This model finds that observable talent narrows the gap between social optimum and equilibrium allocation of entrants though does not eliminate the inefficiency entirely.
