= Barbara Tversky =

American psychologist

- Born: Barbara Gans
- Education: University of Michigan
- Spouse: Amos Tversky (m. 1963; died 1996)
- Partner: Daniel Kahneman (2020–2024; his death)
- Awards: Fellow, American Psychological Society 1995; Fellow, Cognitive Science Society 2002; Fellow, Society of Experimental Psychologists 2004; Fellow, American Academy of Arts and Sciences 2013; Kampé de Fériet Award 2020
- Scientific career
- Fields: Cognitive psychology
- Workplaces: Hebrew University; Stanford University; Columbia University
- Doctoral students: Holly A. Taylor

Barbara Tversky (née Gans) is an American psychologist. She is a professor emerita of psychology at Stanford University and a professor of psychology and education at Teachers College, Columbia University. She was also President of the Association for Psychological Science from 2018-2019. Tversky specializes in cognitive psychology.

== Education ==
Tversky received a B.A. in psychology from the University of Michigan in 1963 and a Ph.D. in psychology from the University of Michigan in 1969.

== Academic career ==
=== Areas of work ===
She is an authority in the areas of visual-spatial reasoning and collaborative cognition. Tversky’s research interests include language and communication, comprehension of events and narratives, and the mapping and modeling of cognitive processes. She is the author of Mind in Motion: How Action Shapes Thought. Basic Books, 2019 and contributes to ongoing projects with Steve Feiner’s AR lab. Tversky has explored the field of embodied cognition surrounding the idea that thinking is involved with the body.

=== Academic roles ===
She has served on the faculty of Stanford University since 1977 and of Teachers College, Columbia University, since 2005. In addition, Tversky has served on the editorial boards of multiple academic journals, including Psychological Research (1976–1984), the Journal of Experimental Psychology: Learning, Memory, and Cognition (1976–1982), the Journal of Experimental Psychology: General (1982–1988), Memory and Cognition (1989–2001), and Cognitive Psychology (1995–2002). She has 318 publication credits in total. Barbara Tversky has also published a podcast on Youtube, where she talks about how the brain works and offers things for people to do to improve their cognitive function.

== Recognition ==
Tversky was elected to the American Academy of Arts and Sciences in 2013, named a Fellow of the American Psychological Society in 1995, the Cognitive Science Society in 2002, and the Society of Experimental Psychologists in 2004. In 1999, she received the Phi Beta Kappa Excellence in Teaching Award. She was also a fellow at the Russell Sage Foundation (2004-2005). In 2020 she received the Kampé de Fériet Award.

== Personal life ==
Tversky was married to fellow psychologist Amos Tversky (1937–1996) from 1963 until his death in 1996. They had three children together. The Tverskys were close friends of Daniel Kahneman, Amos's longtime collaborator. After Kahneman was widowed, Barbara lived with Kahneman from at least 2020 until his death in 2024.

Tversky describes herself as "culturally Jewish".

She was a fan of opera and enjoyed it for most of her life. She was "uneducated in the subject but felt drawn towards the music as her love grew over time.
