= Friedman–Savage utility function =

The Friedman–Savage utility function is the utility function postulated in the theory that Milton Friedman and Leonard J. Savage put forth in their 1948 paper. They argued that the curvature of an individual's utility function differs based upon the amount of wealth the individual has. This variably curving utility function would thereby explain why an individual is risk-loving when he has more wealth (e.g., by playing the lottery) and risk-averse when he is poorer (e.g., by buying insurance). The function has been used widely, including in the field of economic history to explain why social gambling did not necessarily mean that society had gone gambling mad.

== Additions ==
Four years after the publishing of the original article, Harry Markowitz, a former student of Friedman's, argued that some of the implications of the Friedman–Savage utility function were paradoxical. Specifically, its implication that those at the highest level of income would never take risks. His solution was to relate the curvature of an individual's utility function to increases in wealth. This involved determining an individual's "normal" level of income, controlling for utility gains from "recreational investments" (The psychological utility gained by the act of gambling), and measuring deviations from the initial level of utility at the "normal" level of income.

== See also ==
- Expected utility hypothesis
