= Subjective expected utility =

Concept in decision theory

In decision theory, subjective expected utility (SEU) is a framework for modeling how individuals make choices under uncertainty. In particular, it posits that decision-makers have 1) a subjective probability distribution over uncertain states of the world; and 2) a utility function over consequences such that their choice behavior can be described as maximizing expected utility over consequences with respect to their subjective probability. This way, the theory of subjective expected utility combines two subjective concepts: a personal utility function, and a personal probability distribution (usually based on Bayesian probability theory).

SEU is a different approach from the one put forward by von Neumann and Morgenstern in that it does not take (objective) probabilities (i.e., lotteries) as given. Instead, subjective probabilities are used, which are assumed to be consistent with choice behavior.

The main contribution to formalizing SEU was done by L. J. Savage in 1954 (see Savage's axioms), following previous work by Ramsey and von Neumann. (Note: Ramsey says that his essay merely elaborates on the ideas of Charles Sanders Peirce. John von Neumann noted the possibility of simultaneous theory of personal probability and utility, but his death left the specification of an axiomatization of subjective expected utility incomplete.) Savage proved that, if the decision-maker preferences over acts satisfy some reasonable axioms, then their choices can be explained as arising from a utility function $u(x_i)$ combined with the subjective belief that there is a probability of each outcome $P(x_i).$ The subjective expected utility is the resulting expected value of the utility:

$$\Epsilon[u(X)] = \sum_i \; u(x_i) \; P(x_i) .$$

Experiments have shown that many individuals do not behave in a manner consistent with Savage's axioms of subjective expected utility, e.g. most prominently Allais (1953) and Ellsberg (1961).

== See also ==
- Savage's subjective expected utility model
