= Savage's subjective expected utility model =

Economics theorem

In decision theory, Savage's subjective expected utility model (also known as Savage's framework, Savage's axioms, or Savage's representation theorem) is a formalization of subjective expected utility (SEU) developed by Leonard J. Savage in his 1954 book The Foundations of Statistics, based on previous work by Ramsey, von Neumann and de Finetti.

Savage's model concerns with deriving a subjective probability distribution and a utility function such that an agent's choice under uncertainty can be represented via expected-utility maximization. His contributions to the theory of SEU consist of formalizing a framework under which such problem is well-posed, and deriving conditions for its positive solution.

== Primitives and problem ==
Savage's framework posits the following primitives to represent an agent's choice under uncertainty:

- A set of states of the world $\Omega$, of which only one $\omega \in \Omega$ is true. The agent does not know the true $\omega$, so $\Omega$ represents something about which the agent is uncertain.
- A set of consequences $X$: consequences are the objects from which the agent derives utility.
- A set of acts $F$: acts are functions $f: \Omega \rightarrow X$ which map unknown states of the world $\omega \in \Omega$ to tangible consequences $x \in X$.
- A preference relation $\succsim$ over acts in $F$: we write $f \succsim g$ to represent the scenario where, when only able to choose between $f, g \in F$, the agent (weakly) prefers to choose act $f$. The strict preference $f \succ g$ means that $f \succsim g$ but it does not hold that $g \succsim f$.

The model thus deals with conditions over the primitives $(\Omega, X, F, \succsim)$—in particular, over preferences $\succsim$—such that one can represent the agent's preferences via expected-utility with respect to some subjective probability over the states $\Omega$: i.e., there exists a subjective probability distribution $p \in \Delta (\Omega)$ and a utility function $u: X \rightarrow \mathbb R$ such that

$$f \succsim g \iff \mathop{\mathbb{E}}_{\omega \sim p} [u(f(\omega))] \geq \mathop{\mathbb{E}}_{\omega \sim p} [u(g(\omega))],$$

where $\mathop{\mathbb{E}}_{\omega \sim p} [u(f(\omega))] := \int_{\Omega} u(f(\omega)) \text{d}p(\omega)$.

The idea of the problem is to find conditions under which the agent can be thought of choosing among acts $f \in F$ as if he considered only 1) his subjective probability of each state $\omega \in \Omega$ and 2) the utility he derives from consequence $f(\omega)$ given at each state.

== Axioms ==
Savage posits the following axioms regarding $\succsim$:

- P1 (Preference relation) : the relation $\succsim$ is complete (for all $f, g \in F$, it's true that $f \succsim g$ or $g \succsim f$) and transitive.
- P2 (Sure-thing Principle) (Note: Referring to axiom P2 as the sure-thing principle is the most common usage of the term, but Savage originally referred to the concept as P2 in conjunction with P3 and P7, and some authors refer to it just as P7.): for any acts $f, g \in F$, let $f_E g$ be the act that gives consequence $f(\omega)$ if $\omega \in E$ and $g(\omega)$ if $\omega \notin E$. Then for any event $E \subset \Omega$ and any acts $f, g, h, h' \in F$, the following holds:

$$f_Eh \succsim g_E h \implies f_Eh' \succsim g_E h' .$$

In words: if you prefer act $f$ to act $g$ whether the event $E$ happens or not, then it does not matter the consequence when $E$ does not happen.

An event $E \subset \Omega$ is nonnull if the agent has preferences over consequences when $E$ happens: i.e., there exist $f, g, h \in F$ such that $f_E h \succ g_E h$.

- P3 (Monotonicity in consequences): let $f \equiv x$ and $g \equiv y$ be constant acts. Then $f \succsim g$ if and only if $f_E h \succsim g_E h$ for all nonnull events $E$.
- P4 (Independence of beliefs from tastes): for all events $E, E' \subset \Omega$ and constant acts $f \equiv x$, $g \equiv y$, $f' \equiv x'$, $g' \equiv y'$ such that $f \succ g$ and $f' \succ g'$, it holds that

$$f_E g \succsim f_{E'} g \iff f'_E g' \succsim f'_{E'} g'$$.

- P5 (Non-triviality): there exist acts $f, f' \in F$ such that $f \succ f'$.
- P6 (Continuity in events): For all acts $f, g, h \in F$ such that $f \succ g$, there is a finite partition $(E_i)_{i=1}^n$ of $\Omega$ such that $f \succ g_{E_i} h$ and $h_{E_i} f \succ g$ for all $i \leq n$.

The final axiom is more technical, and of importance only when $X$ is infinite. For any $E \subset \Omega$, let $\succsim_{E}$ be the restriction of $\succsim$ to $E$. For any act $f \in F$ and state $\omega \in \Omega$, let $f_{\omega} \equiv f(\omega)$ be the constant act with value $f(\omega)$.

- P7: For all acts $f, g, \in F$ and events $E \subset \Omega$, we have

$$f \succsim_{E} g_{\omega} \text{ } \forall \omega \in E \implies f \succsim_{E} g$$,

$$f_{\omega} \succsim_{E} g \text{ } \forall \omega \in E \implies f \succsim_{E} g$$.

== Savage's representation theorem ==
Theorem: Given an environment $(\Omega, X, F, \succsim)$ as defined above with $X$ finite, the following are equivalent:

1) $\succsim$ satisfies axioms P1-P6.

2) there exists a non-atomic, finitely additive probability measure $p \in \Delta(\Omega)$ defined on $2^{\Omega}$ and a nonconstant function $u: X \rightarrow \mathbb R$ such that, for all $f, g \in F$,

$$f \succsim g \iff \mathop{\mathbb{E}}_{\omega \sim p} [u(f(\omega))] \geq \mathop{\mathbb{E}}_{\omega \sim p} [u(g(\omega))].$$

For infinite $X$, one needs axiom P7. This inclusion makes P3 redundant. Furthermore, in both cases, the probability measure $p$ is unique and the function $u$ is unique up to positive linear transformations.

== See also ==
- Anscombe-Aumann subjective expected utility model
- von Neumann-Morgenstern utility theorem
