= Holly A. Taylor =

American psychologist

- Education: Dartmouth College; Stanford University
- Scientific career
- Fields: Cognitive psychology
- Workplaces: Tufts University
- Doctoral advisor: Barbara Tversky

Holly Ann Taylor is an American cognitive psychologist. She is the Moses Hunt Professor of Psychology at Tufts University School of Arts and Sciences, where she has been a faculty member since 1994. Taylor's research focuses on mental models, spatial cognition, and how nutritional factors affect cognition. She was also a co-director of the Center for Applied Brain and Cognitive Sciences, a collaboration between Tufts and the U.S. Army.

== Education ==
Taylor received a B.A. in mathematics and statistics with a minor in psychology from Dartmouth College in 1987. She earned a Ph.D. in cognitive and experimental psychology from Stanford University in 1992. Her dissertation was titled "Who did what when? Memory organization of event descriptions." Barbara Tversky was Taylor's doctoral advisor.

== Career ==
Taylor joined the faculty at Tufts University School of Arts and Sciences in 1994 as an assistant professor in the psychology department, holding this position from June 1994 to August 1999. She was promoted to associate professor in September 1999 and then to professor in September 2005. In October 2024, she was named the Moses Hunt Professor of Psychology. Taylor has held appointments in Tufts's School of Engineering within the department of mechanical engineering. She served as an adjunct professor from September 2014 to May 2021 and was appointed as a professor in that department on May 20, 2021.

=== Research ===
Taylor's research examines mental models. She is broadly interested in influences on human cognition, with a recurring focus on spatial cognition, education, and comprehension. Her work investigates how different information sources such as learning a campus by walking versus from a map as well as contexts, goals, and experiences influence the development and use of these mental models.

Taylor has collaborated with Robin Kanarek examining nutritional effects on cognitive behavior in both children and adults. In 2008, Taylor led a study published in the journal Appetite which suggested that low-carbohydrate, Atkins-style diets could cause memory loss. The study monitored 19 women and found that after one week of severe carbohydrate restriction, participants showed a gradual decline in performance on memory-related tasks and had slower reaction times compared to those on a low-fat diet. Taylor stated, "This study demonstrates that the food you eat can have an immediate impact on cognitive behaviour... The popular low-carb, no-carb diets have the strongest potential for negative impact on thinking and cognition." She also co-authored a 2010 study, led by biologist Kristen D'Anci, which found that dehydration was associated with negative mood, including fatigue and confusion.

Taylor served as a co-director of the Center for Applied Brain and Cognitive Sciences, which officially opened on October 18, 2016. Her co-director was Caroline R. Mahoney, who had previously co-authored the 2010 dehydration study with Taylor. The center was a joint foundation between Tufts University's School of Engineering and the U.S. Army Natick Soldier Research, Development and Engineering Center. As part of this collaboration, Taylor's work included developing wearable devices to help people improve their orientation and navigation skills, citing an over-reliance on GPS devices.
