= Favourite-longshot bias =

Observed phenomenon in gambling

In gambling and economics, the favorite-longshot bias is an observed phenomenon where on average, betters tend to overvalue "longshots" and relatively undervalue favorites. That is, in a horse race where one horse is given odds of 2-to-1, and another 100-to-1, the true odds might for example be 1.5-to-1 and 300-to-1 respectively. Betting on the "longshot" is therefore a much worse proposition than betting on the favorite. In the long run, losing 5% by betting on the favorite, but losing 40% on longshots is not uncommon.

The phenomenon was first discovered by Griffith. Various theories exist to explain why people willingly bet on such losing propositions, such as risk-loving behavior, risk-averse behavior or simply inaccurate estimation as presented by Sobel and Raines.

Methods such as the goto_conversion, Power and Shin can be used to measure the bias by converting betting odds to true probabilities.

== See also ==
- Rank-dependent expected utility
