= Michael H. Birnbaum =

American psychologist

Michael H. Birnbaum is a professor of Psychology and Director of the Decision Research Center at California State University, Fullerton. He has researched widely in psychology but his major focus has been on individual and social judgment and decision making, and the modelling of behavior. Birnbaum has been president of the Society for Mathematical Psychology, the Society for Judgment and Decision Making, and the Society for Computers in Psychology.

== Selected publications ==
- Birnbaum, M. H. (1998). Measurement, judgment, and decision making. San Diego: Academic Press.
- Birnbaum, M. H. (2000). Psychological experiments on the internet. San Diego, Calif: Academic Press.
- Birnbaum, M. H. (2001). Introduction to behavioral research on the Internet. Upper Saddle River, N.J: Prentice Hall.
