= Psychological Research =

- Discipline: Psychology
- Language: English
- Edited by: Bernhard Hommel

Publication details
- Former name(s): Psychologische Forschung
- History: 1921-present
- Publisher: Springer Science+Business Media
- Frequency: Bimonthly
- Impact factor: 2.681 (2015)

Standard abbreviations
- ISO 4: Psychol. Res.

Indexing
- CODEN: PSREDJ
- ISSN: 0340-0727 (print); 1430-2772 (web)
- LCCN: 74648682
- OCLC no.: 01069731

Links
- Journal homepage; Online archive

Psychological Research (full title: Psychological Research: An International Journal of Perception, Attention, Memory, and Action) is a bimonthly peer-reviewed psychology journal published by Springer Science+Business Media. It was established in 1921 as Psychologische Forschung, obtaining its current name in 1974. The co-founders of the journal were Max Wertheimer, Kurt Koffka, Wolfgang Köhler, Kurt Goldstein, and Hans Walter Gruhle. The journal went on to become the primary organ of the gestalt psychology movement. The current editor-in-chief is Bernhard Hommel (Leiden University). According to the Journal Citation Reports, the journal has a 2015 impact factor of 2.681.
