= Leonard Jimmie Savage =

American statistician

- Born: 20 November 1917; Detroit, Michigan, US
- Died: 1 November 1971 (aged 53); New Haven, Connecticut, US
- Education: University of Michigan (B.A., Ph.D.)
- Known for: Savage loss Savage's axioms Friedman–Savage utility function Halmos–Savage factorization theorem Hewitt–Savage zero–one law Likelihood principle Minmax regret criterion Subjective expected utility Sure-thing principle
- Relatives: I. Richard Savage (brother)
- Scientific career
- Fields: Mathematics, Statistics
- Workplaces: University of Chicago; Princeton University; Yale University; Columbia University; University of Michigan
- Doctoral advisor: Sumner Myers
- Doctoral students: Don Berry; Morris H. DeGroot; Roy Radner; William S. Cleveland

Leonard Jimmie Savage (born Leonard Ogashevitz; 20 November 1917 – 1 November 1971) was an American mathematician and statistician. Economist Milton Friedman said Savage was "one of the few people I have met whom I would unhesitatingly call a genius."

== Education and career ==
Savage was born and grew up in Detroit. He studied at Wayne State University in Detroit before transferring to University of Michigan, where he first majored in chemical engineering, then switched to mathematics, graduating in 1938 with a bachelor's degree. He continued at the University of Michigan with a PhD on differential geometry in 1941 under the supervision of Sumner Byron Myers. Savage subsequently worked at the Institute for Advanced Study in Princeton, New Jersey, the University of Chicago, the University of Michigan, Yale University, and the Statistical Research Group at Columbia University. Though his thesis advisor was Sumner Myers, he also credited Milton Friedman and W. Allen Wallis as statistical mentors.

During World War II, Savage served as chief "statistical" assistant to John von Neumann, the mathematician credited with describing the principles upon which electronic computers should be based. Later he was one of the participants in the Macy conferences on cybernetics.

== Research and contributions ==
His most noted work was the 1954 book The Foundations of Statistics, in which he put forward a theory of subjective and personal probability and statistics which forms one of the strands underlying Bayesian statistics and has applications to game theory. Furthermore in 1965, Savage and Lester Dubins wrote How to Gamble If You Must: Inequalities for Stochastic Processes which presented a mathematical theory for optimal behavior in gambling situations.

One of Savage's indirect contributions was his discovery of the work of Louis Bachelier on stochastic models for asset prices and the mathematical theory of option pricing. Savage brought the work of Bachelier to the attention of Paul Samuelson. It was from Samuelson's subsequent writing that "random walk" (and subsequently Brownian motion) became fundamental to mathematical finance.

In 1951 he introduced the minimax regret criterion used in decision theory. The Hewitt–Savage zero–one law and Friedman–Savage utility function are (in part) named after him, as is the Savage Award given annually by the International Society for Bayesian Analysis for the best dissertations in Bayesian analysis.

== Bibliography ==
- Savage, Leonard J. (1954). The Foundations of Statistics. Wiley.
- Savage, Leonard J. (1961). The Subjective Basis of Statistical Practice. University of Michigan.
- Savage, Leonard J. (1962). The Foundations of Statistical Inference: A Discussion. Methuen.
- Savage, Leonard J. (1972). The Foundations of Statistics (2nd ed.). New York: Dover Publications. ISBN 978-0-486-62349-8.
- Dubins, Lester E.; Savage, Leonard J. (1976). Inequalities for Stochastic Processes: How to Gamble If You Must. Dover Publications. ISBN 978-0-486-63283-4.

== See also ==
- Loss function
- Friedman–Savage utility function
