= Amos Tversky =

Israeli psychologist (1937–1996)

- עמוס טברסקי
- Born: Amos Nathan Tversky; March 16, 1937; Haifa, British Mandate of Palestine
- Died: June 2, 1996 (aged 59); Stanford, California, U.S.
- Citizenship: Israeli
- Education: University of Michigan (BA); Hebrew University (PhD)
- Known for: Prospect theory Heuristics and biases
- Spouse: Barbara Tversky (m. 1963)
- Awards: MacArthur Award; Grawemeyer Award in Psychology (2003)
- Military career
- Allegiance: Israel
- Branch: Israel Defense Forces
- Rank: Seren (Captain)
- Conflicts: Suez Crisis; Six-Day War; Yom Kippur War
- Scientific career
- Fields: Cognitive psychology, Behavioral economics
- Workplaces: Hebrew University; Stanford University
- Doctoral students: Maya Bar-Hillel; Ruma Falk

Amos Nathan Tversky (Hebrew: עמוס טברסקי; March 16, 1937 – June 2, 1996) was an Israeli cognitive and mathematical psychologist and a key figure in the discovery of systematic human cognitive bias and handling of risk.

Much of his early work concerned the foundations of measurement. He was co-author of a three-volume treatise, Foundations of Measurement. His early work with Daniel Kahneman focused on the psychology of prediction and probability judgment; later they worked together to develop prospect theory, which aims to explain irrational human economic choices and is considered one of the seminal works of behavioral economics.

Six years after Tversky's death, Kahneman received the 2002 Nobel Memorial Prize in Economic Sciences for work he did in collaboration with Amos Tversky. While Nobel Prizes are not awarded posthumously, Kahneman has commented that he feels "it is a joint prize. We were twinned for more than a decade."

Tversky also collaborated with many leading researchers including Thomas Gilovich, Itamar Simonson, Paul Slovic and Richard Thaler. A Review of General Psychology survey, published in 2002, ranked Tversky as the 93rd most cited psychologist of the 20th century, tied with Edwin Boring, John Dewey, and Wilhelm Wundt.

== Early life and education ==
Tversky was born in Haifa, British Palestine (now Israel), as son of the Polish-born veterinarian Yosef Tversky and Lithuanian Jewish Jenia Tversky (née Ginzburg), a social worker who later became a member of the Knesset representing the Mapai (Workers' Party). Tversky had one sister, Ruth, thirteen years his senior.

Tversky's mother has said he was self-taught in many areas, including mathematics. In high school, Tversky took classes from literary critic Baruch Kurzweil, and befriended classmate Dahlia Ravikovich, who would become an award-winning poet.

Tversky received his bachelor's degree from Hebrew University of Jerusalem in Israel in 1961, and his doctorate in psychology from the University of Michigan in Ann Arbor in 1965. He had already developed a clear vision of researching judgement.

== Military service ==
After high school, Tversky was conscripted into the Israel Defense Forces and served in the Paratroopers Brigade. During this time he was also a member and leader in Nahal, an IDF program that combined compulsory military service with the establishment of agricultural settlements.

Tversky served with distinction as a paratrooper, making over fifty jumps and eventually rising to the rank of captain. He was decorated for bravery after saving the life of one of his soldiers during a training exercise. In 1956, when Tversky was a platoon commander, his unit conducted a training exercise in front of the IDF General Staff. One of his soldiers was assigned to clear a barbed wire fence with a bangalore torpedo. After activating the fuse, the soldier suffered a panic attack and froze in place instead of running for cover. Ignoring the orders of his commanding officer for everyone to stay put, Tversky rushed from behind the wall that was serving as cover for his unit, picked up the soldier and hauled him ten yards, tossed him on the ground, and covered him with his body. Tversky was wounded by shrapnel from the explosion, which remained in his body for the rest of his life. The soldier he saved was unharmed. When handing him his decoration, IDF Chief of Staff Moshe Dayan, who had witnessed the incident, told him "you did a very stupid and brave thing and you won't get away with it again." Tversky participated in three wars. He parachuted into combat during the Suez Crisis in 1956, commanded an infantry unit during the Six-Day War in 1967, and served in a psychology field-unit during the Yom Kippur War in 1973.

== Academic career ==
=== Academic roles ===
After his doctorate, Tversky taught at Hebrew University. He then joined the faculty in the Department of Psychology of Stanford University in 1978, where he spent the rest of his career.

=== Academic work ===
==== Work with Daniel Kahneman ====
Amos Tversky's most influential work was done with his longtime collaborator, Daniel Kahneman, in a partnership that began in the late 1960s. Their work explored the biases and failures in rationality continually exhibited in human decision-making. Starting with their first paper together, "Belief in the Law of Small Numbers", Kahneman and Tversky laid out eleven "cognitive illusions" that affect human judgment, frequently using small-scale empirical experiments that demonstrate how subjects make irrational decisions under uncertain conditions. (They introduced the notion of cognitive bias in 1972.) This work was highly influential in the field of economics, which had largely presumed rationality of all actors.

According to Kahneman the collaboration 'tapered off' in the early 1980s, although they tried to revive it. Factors included Tversky receiving most of the external credit for the output of the partnership, and a reduction in the generosity with which Tversky and Kahneman interacted with each other.

==== Comparative ignorance ====
Tversky and Kahneman (1995) addressed ambiguity aversion, the idea that people do not like ambiguous gambles or choices with ambiguity, with the comparative ignorance framework. Their idea was that people are only ambiguity averse when their attention is specifically brought to the ambiguity by comparing an ambiguous option to an unambiguous option. For instance, people are willing to bet more on choosing a correct colored ball from an urn containing equal proportions of black and red balls than an urn with unknown proportions of balls when evaluating both of these urns at the same time. However, when evaluating them separately, people are willing to bet approximately the same amount on either urn. Thus, when it is possible to compare the ambiguous gamble to an unambiguous gamble people are averse — but not when one is ignorant of this comparison.

==== Notable contributions ====
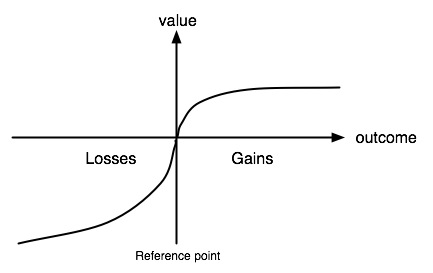
The shape of the value (utility) function in prospect theory. The asymmetry of the function corresponds to loss aversion.

- foundations of measurement
- anchoring and adjustment
- availability heuristic
- base rate fallacy
- conjunction fallacy
- framing
- behavioral finance
- clustering illusion
- loss aversion
- prospect theory
- cumulative prospect theory
- representativeness heuristic
- Tversky index
- support theory
- contrast model
- feature matching account of similarity

=== Approach to research ===
Kahneman said that Tversky "had simply perfect taste in choosing problems, and he never wasted much time on anything that was not destined to matter. He also had an unfailing compass that always kept him going forward.

Tversky's 1974 Science article with Kahneman on cognitive illusions triggered a "cascade of related research," Science News wrote in a 1994 article tracing the recent history of research on reasoning. Decision theorists in economics, business, philosophy and medicine as well as psychologists cited their work.

=== Recognition ===
In 1980, he became a fellow of the American Academy of Arts and Sciences.

In 1984 he was a recipient of the MacArthur Fellowship, and in 1985 he was elected to the National Academy of Sciences. Tversky, as a co-recipient with Daniel Kahneman, earned the 2003 University of Louisville Grawemeyer Award for Psychology.

After Tversky's death, Kahneman was awarded the 2002 Nobel Memorial Prize in Economic Sciences for the work he did in collaboration with Tversky. Nobel prizes are not awarded posthumously.

== Personality and characteristics ==
Kahneman has said "Amos was the freest person I have known, and he was able to be free because he was also one of the most disciplined."

Persi Diaconis, a professor of mathematics at Stanford, has said "You were happy being in his presence. There was a light shining out of him."

Gerhard Casper, President of Stanford University, said Tversky "maintained the highest standards of professional ethics", and "His dedication to Stanford and its institutions of faculty governance was exemplary."

Whilst being very collaborative, Tversky also had a lifelong habit of working alone at night while others slept.

In intellectual debate Tversky "wanted to crush the opposition".

Tversky believed that humans live under uncertainty, in a probabilistic universe.

== Personal life ==
In 1963, Tversky married American psychologist Barbara Gans, who later became a very influential professor at Stanford University, working on gestures and thought. They had three children together.

He died of a metastatic melanoma in 1996.

He was a Jewish atheist.

== In popular culture ==
=== Tversky intelligence test ===
As recounted by Canadian writer Malcolm Gladwell in 2013's David and Goliath: Underdogs, Misfits, and the Art of Battling Giants, Tversky's peers thought so highly of him that they devised a tongue-in-cheek one-part test for measuring intelligence. As related to Gladwell by psychologist Adam Alter, the Tversky intelligence test was "The faster you realized Tversky was smarter than you, the smarter you were."

=== The Undoing Project ===
Michael Lewis's book The Undoing Project: A Friendship That Changed Our Minds, released in 2016, is about Tversky's personal and professional relationship with Daniel Kahneman.
