= Mixture-space theorem =

Utility-representation theorem in Decision Theory

In microeconomic theory and decision theory, the Mixture-space theorem is a utility-representation theorem for preferences defined over general mixture spaces.

The theorem generalizes the von Neumann–Morgenstern utility theorem and the usual utility-representation theorem for consumer preferences over $\mathbb R^n$. It was first proven by Israel Nathan Herstein and John Milnor in 1953, together with the introduction of the definition of a mixture space.

== Mixture spaces ==
=== Definition ===
Mixture spaces, as introduced by Herstein and Milnor, are a generalization of convex sets from vector spaces. Formally:

Definition: A mixture space is a pair $(X, h)$, where

- $X$ is just any set, and
- $h : [0,1] \times X \times X \to \mathbb R$ is a mixture function: it associates with each $\alpha \in [0,1]$ and each pair $x, y \in X \times X$ the $\alpha$-mixture of the two, $h_{\alpha}(x, y) \equiv h(\alpha, x, y)$, such that
1. $h_1 (x, y) = x$.
2. $h_{\alpha} (x, y) = h_{1-\alpha} (y, x)$.
3. $h_{\alpha} (h_{\beta} (x, y), y) = h_{\alpha \beta} (x, y)$.

Mixture spaces are essentially a special case of convex spaces (also called barycentric algebras), where the mixing operation is restricted to be over $[0,1]$ and not just an appropriately closed subset of a semiring.

=== Examples ===
Some examples and non-examples of mixture spaces are:

- Vector spaces: any convex subset $X$ of a vector space $(V, +, \cdot)$ over $\mathbb R$, with $h_{\alpha} (x, y) = \alpha x + (1-\alpha) y$ constitutes a mixture space $(X, h)$.
- Lotteries: given any finite set $X$, the set $\mathcal L(x) = \left\{p: X \to [0,1] : \sum_x p(x) = 1\right\}$ of lotteries over $X$ constitutes a mixture space, with $h_{\alpha}(p, q) (x) : = \alpha p(x) + (1-\alpha) q(x)$. Notice that this induces an "isomorphic" mixture space of CDFs over $X$, with the naturally-induced mixture function.
- Quantile functions: for any CDF $F: \mathbb R \to [0,1]$, define $Q_F: [0,1] \to \mathbb R$ as its quantile function. For any two CDFs $F_1, F_2$ and any $\alpha \in [0,1]$, define the mixture operation $\alpha F_1 \boxplus (1-\alpha) F_2$ as the CDF for the quantile function $\alpha Q_{F_1} + (1-\alpha) Q_{F_2}$. This does not define a mixture over CDFs, but it does define a mixture over quantile functions.

== Axioms and theorem ==
=== Axioms ===
Herstein and Milnor proposed the following axioms for preferences $\succsim$ over $X$ when $(X, h)$ is a mixture space:

- Axiom 1 (Preference Relation): $\succsim$ is a weak order, in the sense that it is complete (for all $x, y \in X$, it's true that $x \succsim y$ or $y \succsim x$) and transitive.
- Axiom 2 (Independence): For any $x, y, z \in X$,

$x \sim y \implies h_{1/2}(x, z) \sim h_{1/2}(y, z).$ (Note: This version of the Independence Axiom is equivalent to the more usual one of von Neumann-Morgenstern which requires a general $\alpha \in [0,1]$ instead of just $\alpha = 1/2$.)

- Axiom 3 (Mixture Continuity): for any $x, y, z \in X$, the sets

$$\{\alpha \in [0,1] : h_{\alpha}(x, y) \succsim z\},$$
$$\{\alpha \in [0,1] : h_{\alpha}(x, y) \precsim z\}$$

are closed in $[0,1]$ with the usual topology.

The Mixture-Continuity Axiom is a way of introducing some form of continuity for the preferences without having to consider a topological structure over $X$.

=== Theorem ===
Theorem (Herstein & Milnor 1953): Given any mixture space $(X, h)$ and a preference relation $\succsim$ over $X$, the following are equivalent:

- $\succsim$ satisfies Axioms 1, 2, and 3.
- There exists a mixture-preserving utility function $U: X \to \mathbb R$ that represents $\succsim$, where "mixture-preserving" represents a form of linearity: for any $x, y \in X$ and any $\alpha \in [0,1]$,

$$U(h_{\alpha}(x, y)) = \alpha U(x) + (1-\alpha) U(y)$$.
