= Debreu's representation theorems =

In economics, the Debreu's theorems are preference representation theorems—statements about the representation of a preference ordering by a real-valued utility function. The theorems were proved by Gerard Debreu during the 1950s.

== Background ==
Suppose a person is asked questions of the form "Do you prefer A or B?" (when A and B can be options, actions to take, states of the world, consumption bundles, etc.). All the responses are recorded and form the person's preference relation. Instead of recording the person's preferences between every pair of options, it would be much more convenient to have a single utility function - a function that maps a real number to each option, such that the utility of option A is larger than that of option B if and only if the agent prefers A to B.

Debreu's theorems address the following question: what conditions on the preference relation guarantee the existence of a representing utility function?

== Existence of ordinal utility function ==
The 1954 Theorems say, roughly, that every preference relation which is complete, transitive and continuous, can be represented by a continuous ordinal utility function.

=== Statement ===
The theorems are usually applied to spaces of finite commodities. However, they are applicable in a much more general setting. These are the general assumptions:

- X is a topological space.
- $\preceq$ is a relation on X which is total (all items are comparable) and transitive.
- $\preceq$ is continuous. This means that the following equivalent conditions are satisfied:
  1. For every $x\in X$, the sets $\{y|y\preceq x\}$ and $\{y|y\succeq x\}$ are topologically closed in $X$.
  2. For every sequence $(x_i)$ such that $x_i \to x_\infty$, if for all i $x_i\preceq y$ then $x_\infty\preceq y$, and if for all i $x_i\succeq y$ then $x_\infty\succeq y$

Each one of the following conditions guarantees the existence of a real-valued continuous function that represents the preference relation $\preceq$. The conditions are increasingly general, so for example, condition 1 implies 2, which implies 3, which implies 4.

1. The set of equivalence classes of the relation $\sim$ (defined by: $x\sim y$ iff $x\preceq y$ and $x\succeq y$) are a countable set.

2. There is a countable subset of X, $Z=\{z_0,z_1,...\}$, such that for every pair of non-equivalent elements $x\prec y$, there is an element $z_i\in Z$ that separates them ($x\preceq z_i \preceq y$).

3. X is separable and connected.

4. X is second countable. This means that there is a countable set S of open sets, such that every open set in X is the union of sets of the class S.

The proof for the first result had a gap which Debreu later corrected.

=== Examples ===
A. Let $X=\mathbb{R}^2$ with the standard topology (the Euclidean topology). Define the following preference relation: $(x,y)\preceq (x',y')$ iff $x+y \leq x'+y'$. It is continuous because for every $(x,y)$, the sets $\{(x',y')|x'+y'\leq x+y\}$ and $\{(x',y')|x'+y'\geq x+y\}$ are closed half-planes. Condition 1 is violated because the set of equivalence classes is uncountable. However, condition 2 is satisfied with Z as the set of pairs with rational coordinates. Condition 3 is also satisfied since X is separable and connected. Hence, there exists a continuous function which represents $\preceq$. An example of such function is $u(x,y)=x+y$.

B. Let $X=\mathbb{R}^2$ with the standard topology as above. The lexicographic preferences relation is not continuous in that topology. For example, $(5,1)\succ (5,0)$, but in every ball around (5,1) there are points with $x<5$ and these points are inferior to $(5,0)$. Indeed, this relation cannot be represented by a continuous real-valued function (in fact, it cannot be represented even by non-continuous functions).

=== Proofs ===
Proofs from.

Notation: for any $x, y \in X$, define $(x, y) = \{z\in X: x \prec z \prec y\}$, and similarly define other intervals.

Proof of 1, 2

For 1, use the proposition that any countable linear ordering is isomorphic to a subset of $\mathbb Q$.

For 2, first use the proposition to construct a utility $u: \{z_1, z_2, ...\}\to \mathbb Q$ that preserves the ordering. Then for each $x\in X$ not equivalent to one of the $z_n$, construct its upper and lower Dedekind cuts $(x, +\infty) = \{z_n: z_n \succ x\}, (-\infty, x) = \{z_n: z_n \prec x\}$. By density of the set $\{z_1, z_2, ...\}$, two such $x, x'$ have the same ordering iff their Dedekind cuts are equal.

Then, define $u(x) = \frac 12 (\sup u((-\infty, x)) + \inf u((x, +\infty)))$. This defines a utility function $u: X \to [-\infty, +\infty]$.

Finally, use the hyperbolic tangent function $tanh: [-\infty, +\infty] \to [-1, 1]$ to squeeze the extended real line to a finite interval.

Proof of 3

If $\succeq$ is trivial on $X$ then define $u =0$. So assume it's not trivial.

If $Y$ is dense in $X$, then if $x\succ y$ in $X$, there exists $z\in Y$ such that $x \succ z \succ y$

The intervals $(-\infty, x), (y, +\infty)$ are nonempty since $y \in (-\infty, x), x\in (y, +\infty)$.

By continuity of $\succ$, both intervals are open subsets of $X$. By totality of $\succ$, their union is all of $X$. Since $X$ is connected, their intersection is nonempty. Thus exists some $z'\in X$ such that $x \succ z' \succ y$.

Since $Y$ is dense in $X$, and $\succ$ is continuous, there exists a close enough $z\in Y$ such that $x \succ z \succ y$.

Since $X$ is separable, we apply part 2.

Proof of 4

Enumerate the countable set of basis sets $S_1, S_2, ...$. For each $S_n$, pick one representative $z_n\in S_n$, and gather them into one set $Z$. This means that any $x, y\in S$ if $x\prec y$ and $(x, y)$ is nonempty, then there exists some $z_n \in S_n \subset (x, y)$, so that $x \prec z_n \prec y$. It remains to deal with the exceptions.

Define a "gap pair" to be $x, y\in S$ such that $x \prec y$ and $(x, y)$ is empty. Pick a set of representatives $x_i, y_i$, such that for any gap pair $x, y$ there exists exactly one pair of representatives $x_i, y_i$ such that $x_i \sim x, y_i \sim y$.

For each pair $x_i, y_i$, choose some $n_i$ such that $S_{n_i} \subset (-\infty, y_i)$, and $x_i \in S_{n_i}$. It's easy to check that if $S_{n_i} = S_{n_j}$ then we must have $x_i \sim x_j$. Thus the number of gap pair representatives is at most countable.

Now the set $Z \cup \{x_i\}_i \cup \{y_i\}_i$ is countable, and we use part 2.

=== Applications ===
Diamond applied Debreu's theorem to the space $X=\ell^\infty$, the set of all bounded real-valued sequences with the topology induced by the supremum metric (see L-infinity). X represents the set of all utility streams with infinite horizon.

In addition to the requirement that $\preceq$ be total, transitive and continuous, he added a sensitivity requirement:

- If a stream $x$ is smaller than a stream $y$ in every time period, then $x\prec y$.
- If a stream $x$ is smaller-than-or-equal-to a stream $y$ in every time period, then $x\preceq y$.

Under these requirements, every stream $x$ is equivalent to a constant-utility stream, and every two constant-utility streams are separable by a constant-utility stream with a rational utility, so condition #2 of Debreu is satisfied, and the preference relation can be represented by a real-valued function.

The existence result is valid even when the topology of X is changed to the topology induced by the discounted metric: $d(x,y)=\sum_{t=1}^\infty{2^{-t}|x_t-y_t|}$

== Additivity of ordinal utility function ==
Theorem 3 of 1960 says, roughly, that if the commodity space contains 3 or more components, and every subset of the components is preferentially-independent of the other components, then the preference relation can be represented by an additive value function.

=== Statement ===
These are the general assumptions:

- X, the space of all bundles, is a cartesian product of n commodity spaces: $X = \times_{i=1}^n{X_i}$ (i.e., the space of bundles is a set of n-tuples of commodities).
- $\preceq$ is a relation on X which is total (all items are comparable) and transitive.
- $\preceq$ is continuous (see above).
- There exists an ordinal utility function, $v$, representing $\preceq$.

The function $v$ is called additive if it can be written as a sum of n ordinal utility functions on the n factors:

$$v(x_1,...,x_n)=\sum_{i=1}^n{k_i v_i(x_i)}$$

where the $k_i$ are constants.

Given a set of indices $I$, the set of commodities $(X_i)_{i\in I}$ is called preferentially independent if the preference relation $\preceq$ induced on $(X_i)_{i\in I}$, given constant quantities of the other commodities $(X_i)_{i\notin I}$, does not depend on these constant quantities.

If $v$ is additive, then obviously all subsets of commodities are preferentially-independent.

If all subsets of commodities are preferentially-independent AND at least three commodities are essential (meaning that their quantities have an influence on the preference relation $\preceq$), then $v$ is additive.

Moreover, in that case $v$ is unique up to an increasing linear transformation.

For an intuitive constructive proof, see Ordinal utility - Additivity with three or more goods.

== Theorems on Cardinal utility ==
Theorem 1 of 1960 deals with preferences on lotteries. It can be seen as an improvement to the von Neumann–Morgenstern utility theorem of 1947. The earlier theorem assumes that agents have preferences on lotteries with arbitrary probabilities. Debreu's theorem weakens this assumption and assumes only that agents have preferences on equal-chance lotteries (i.e., they can only answer questions of the form: "Do you prefer A over an equal-chance lottery between B and C?").

Formally, there is a set $S$ of sure choices. The set of lotteries is $S\times S$. Debreu's theorem states that if:

1. The set of all sure choices $S$ is a connected and separable space;
2. The preference relation on the set of lotteries $S\times S$ is continuous - the sets $\{(A,B)\in S\times S|(A,B)\preceq (A',B')\}$ and $\{(A,B)\in S\times S| (A,B)\succeq (A',B')\}$ are topologically closed for all $(A,B)\in S$;
3. $(A_1,B_2)\preceq (A_2,B_1)$ and $(A_2,B_3)\preceq (A_3,B_2)$ implies $(A_1,B_3)\preceq (A_3,B_1)$

Then there exists a cardinal utility function u that represents the preference relation on the set of lotteries, i.e.:

$$u(A,B) =\frac{u(A,A)+u(B,B)}{2}$$

Theorem 2 of 1960 deals with agents whose preferences are represented by frequency-of-choice. When they can choose between A and B, they choose A with frequency $p(A,B)$ and B with frequency $p(B,A)=1-p(A,B)$. The value $p(A,B)$ can be interpreted as measuring how much the agent prefers A over B.

Debreu's theorem states that if the agent's function p satisfies the following conditions:

1. Completeness: $p(A,B)+p(B,A)=1$
2. Quadruple Condition: $p(A,B)\leq p(C,D) \iff p(A,C)\leq p(B,D)$
3. Continuity: if $p(A,B)\leq q\leq p(A,D)$, then there exists C such that: $p(A,C)=q$.

Then there exists a cardinal utility function u that represents p, i.e:

$$p(A,B)\leq p(C,D) \iff u(A)-u(B)\leq u(C)-u(D)$$

== See also ==
- Preference representation theorem
- Von Neumann–Morgenstern utility theorem
