= Utility representation theorem =

Theorem in economics

In economics, a utility representation theorem shows that, under certain conditions, a preference ordering can be represented by a real-valued utility function, such that option A is preferred to option B if and only if the utility of A is larger than that of B. The most famous example of a utility representation theorem is the Von Neumann–Morgenstern utility theorem, which shows that any rational agent has a utility function that measures their preferences over lotteries.

== Background ==
Suppose a person is asked questions of the form "Do you prefer A or B?" (when A and B can be options, actions to take, states of the world, consumption bundles, etc.). If the agent prefers A to B, we write $A\succ B$. The set of all such preference-pairs forms the person's preference relation.

Instead of recording the person's preferences between every pair of options, it would be much more convenient to have a single utility function - a function u that assigns a real number to each option, such that $u(A)>u(B)$ if and only if $A\succ B$.

Not every preference-relation has a utility-function representation. For example, if the relation is not transitive (the agent prefers A to B, B to C, and C to A), then it has no utility representation, since any such utility function would have to satisfy $u(A)>u(B) > u(C) > u(A)$, which is impossible.

A utility representation theorem gives conditions on a preference relation, that are sufficient for the existence of a utility representation.

Often, one would like the representing function u to satisfy additional conditions, such as continuity. This requires additional conditions on the preference relation.

== Definitions ==
The set of options is a topological space denoted by X. In some cases we assume that X is also a metric space; in particular, X can be a subset of a Euclidean space R^{m}, such that each coordinate in {1,..., m} represents a commodity, and each m-vector in X represents a possible consumption bundle.

=== Preference relations ===
A preference relation is a subset of $X\times X$. It is denoted by either $\succ$ or $\succeq$:

- The notation $\succ$ is used when the relation is strict, that is, $A\succ B$ means that option A is strictly better than option B. In this case, the relation should be irreflexive, that is, $A\succ A$ does not hold. It should also be asymmetric, that is, $A\succ B$ implies that not $B\succ A$.
- The notation $\succeq$ is used when the relation is weak, that is, $A\succeq B$ means that option A is at least as good as option B (A may be equivalent to B, or better than B). In this case, the relation should be reflexive, that is, $A\succeq A$ always holds.

Given a weak preference relation $\succeq$, one can define its "strict part" $\succ$ and "indifference part" $\simeq$ as follows:

- $A\succ B$ if and only if $A\succeq B$ and not $B\succeq A$.
- $A \simeq B$ if and only if $A\succeq B$ and $B\succeq A$.

Given a strict preference relation $\succ$, one can define its "weak part" $\succeq$ and "indifference part" $\simeq$ as follows:

- $A\succeq B$ if and only if not $B \succ A$;
- $A \simeq B$ if and only if not $B \succ A$ and not $A \succ B$.

For every option $A \in X$, we define the contour sets at A:

- Given a weak preference relation $\succeq$, the weak upper contour set at A is the set of all options that are at least as good as A: $\{B\in X : B\succeq A \}$. The weak lower contour set at A is the set of all options that are at most as good as A: $\{B\in X : A \succeq B \}$.
  - A weak preference relation is called continuous if its contour sets are topologically closed.
- Similarly, given a strict preference relation $\succ$, the strict upper contour set at A is the set of all options better than A: $\{B\in X : B\succ A \}$, and the strict lower contour set at A is the set of all options worse than A: $\{B\in X : A \succ B \}$.
  - A strict preference relation is called continuous if its contour sets are topologically open.

Sometimes, the above continuity notions are called semicontinuous, and a $\succeq$ is called continuous if it is a closed subset of $X\times X$.

A preference-relation is called:

- Countable - if the set of equivalence classes of the indifference relation $\simeq$ is countable.
- Separable - if there exists a countable subset $Z\subseteq X$ such that for every pair $A\succ B$, there is an element $z_i\in Z$ that separates them, that is, $A \succ z_i \succ B$ (an analogous definition exists for weak relations).

As an example, the strict order ">" on real numbers is separable, but not countable.

=== Utility functions ===
A utility function is a function $u: X \to \mathbb{R}$.

- A utility function u is said to represent a strict preference relation $\succ$, if $u(A) > u(B) \iff A\succ B$.
- A utility function u is said to represent a weak preference relation $\succeq$, if $u(A) \geq u(B) \iff A \succeq B$.

== Complete preference relations ==
Debreu proved the existence of a continuous representation of a weak preference relation $\succeq$ satisfying the following conditions:

1. Reflexive and Transitive;
2. Complete, that is, for every two options A, B in X, either $A\succeq B$ or $B\succeq A$ or both;
3. For all $A \in X$, both the upper and the lower weak contour sets are topologically closed;
4. The space X is second-countable. This means that there is a countable set S of open sets, such that every open set in X is the union of sets of the class S. Second-countability is implied by the following properties (from weaker to stronger):
  - The space X is separable and connected.
  - The relation $\succeq$ is separable.
  - The relation $\succeq$ is countable.

Jaffray gives an elementary proof to the existence of a continuous utility function.

== Incomplete preference relations ==
Preferences are called incomplete when some options are incomparable, that is, neither $A\succeq B$ nor $B \succeq A$ holds. This case is denoted by $A \bowtie B$. Since real numbers are always comparable, it is impossible to have a representing function u with $u(A) \geq u(B) \iff A \succeq B$. There are several ways to cope with this issue.

=== One-directional representation ===
Peleg defined a utility function representation of a strict partial order $\succ$ as a function $u: X \to \mathbb{R}$ such that$A \succ B \implies u(A)>u(B)$, that is, only one direction of implication should hold. Peleg proved the existence of a one-dimensional continuous utility representation of a strict preference relation $\succ$ satisfying the following conditions:

1. Irreflexive and transitive (which implies that it is asymmetric, that is, is a strict partial order);
2. Separable;
3. For all $A \in X$, the lower strict contour set at A is topologically open;
4. Spacious: if $A\succ B$, then the lower strict contour set at A contains the closure of the lower strict contour set at B.
  - This condition is required for incomplete preference relations. For complete preference relations, every relation in which all lower and upper strict contour sets are open, is also spacious.

If we are given a weak preference relation $\succeq$, we can apply Peleg's theorem by defining a strict preference relation: $A\succ B$ if and only if $A\succeq B$ and not $B\succeq A$.

The second condition ($\succ$ is separable) is implied by the following three conditions:

- The space X is separable;
- For all $A \in X$, both lower and upper strict contour sets at A are topologically open;
- If the lower countour set of A is nonempty, then A is in its closure.

A similar approach was taken by Richter. Therefore, this one-directional representation is also called a Richter-Peleg utility representation.

Jaffray defines a utility function representation of a strict partial order $\succ$ as a function $u: X \to \mathbb{R}$ such that both $A \succ B \implies u(A)>u(B)$, and $A\approx B \implies u(A)=u(B)$, where the relation $A\approx B$ is defined by: for all C, $A\succ C \iff B\succ C$ and $C\succ A \iff C\succ B$ (that is: the lower and upper contour sets of A and B are identical). He proved that, for every partially-ordered space $(X, \succ)$ that is perfectly-separable, there exists a utility function that is upper-semicontinuous in any topology stronger than the upper order topology. An analogous statement states the existence of a utility function that is lower-semicontinuous in any topology stronger than the lower order topology.

Sondermann defines a utility function representation similarly to Jaffray. He gives conditions for existence of a utility function representation on a probability space, that is upper semicontinuous or lower semicontinuous in the order topology.

Herden defines a utility function representation of a weak preorder $\succeq$ as an isotone function $u: (X, \succeq) \to (\mathbb{R}, \geq)$ such that $A \succ B \implies u(A)>u(B)$. Herden proved that a weak preorder $\succeq$ on X has a continuous utility function, if and only if there exists a countable family E of separable systems on X such that, for all pairs $A\succ B$, there is a separable system F in E, such that B is contained in all sets in F, and A is not contained in any set in F. He shows that this theorem implies Peleg's representation theorem. In a follow-up paper he clarifies the relation between this theorem and classical utility representation theorems on complete orders.

=== Multi-utility representation ===
A multi-utility representation (MUR) of a relation $\succeq$ is a set U of utility functions, such that $A \succeq B \iff \forall u\in U: u(A)\geq u(B)$. In other words, A is preferred to B if and only if all utility functions in the set U unanimously hold this preference. The concept was introduced by Efe Ok.

Every preorder (reflexive and transitive relation) has a trivial MUR. Moreover, every preorder with closed upper contour sets has an upper-semicontinuous MUR, and every preorder with closed lower contour sets has a lower-semicontinuous MUR. However, not every preorder with closed upper and lower contour sets has a continuous MUR. Ok and Evren present several conditions on the existence of a continuous MUR:

- $\succeq$ has a continuous MUR if-and-only-if (X,$\succeq$) is a semi-normally-preordered topological space.
- If X is a locally compact and sigma-compact Hausdorff space, and $\succeq$ is a closed subset of $X\times X$, then $\succeq$ has a continuous MUR. This in particular holds if X is a nonempty closed subset of a Euclidean space.
- If X is any topological space, and $\succeq$ is a preorder with closed upper and lower contour sets, that satisfies strong local non-satiation and an additional property called niceness, then $\succeq$ has a continuous MUR.

All the representations guaranteed by the above theorems might contain infinitely many utilities, and even uncountably many utilities. In practice, it is often important to have a finite MUR - a MUR with finitely many utilities. Evren and Ok prove there exists a finite MUR where all utilities are upper[lower] semicontinuous for any weak preference relation $\succeq$ satisfying the following conditions:

1. Reflexive and Transitive (that is, $\succeq$ is a weak preorder);
2. All upper[lower] contour sets are topologically closed;
3. The space X is second-countable, that is, it has a countable basis.
4. The width of $\succeq$ (the largest size of a set in which all elements are incomparable) is finite.
  - The number of utility functions in the representation is at most the width of $\succeq$.

Note that the guaranteed functions are semicontinuous, but not necessarily continuous, even if all upper and lower contour sets are closed. Evren and Ok say that "there does not seem to be a natural way of deriving a continuous finite multi-utility representation theorem, at least, not by using the methods adopted in this paper".

== See also ==
- Von Neumann-Morgenstern utility theorem
- Harsanyi's utilitarian theorem
- Arrow's impossibility theorem
- Revealed preference theory deals with representing the demand function of an agent by a preference relation, or by a utility function.
