= Bergstrom-Walker Theorem =

Bergstrom-Walker Theorem is a result in economics which state that for a lower semi-continuous and acyclic preference ordering on a compact budget set one can always find a maximal element.
