= Convex space =

Type of mathematical space

In mathematics, a convex space (or barycentric algebra) is a space in which it is possible to take convex combinations of any finite set of points.

== Formal definition ==
A convex space can be defined as a set $X$ equipped with a binary convex combination operation $c_\lambda : X \times X \rightarrow X$ for each $\lambda \in [0,1]$ satisfying:

- $c_0(x,y)=x$
- $c_1(x,y)=y$
- $c_\lambda(x,x)=x$
- $c_\lambda(x,y)=c_{1-\lambda}(y,x)$
- $c_\lambda(x,c_\mu(y,z))=c_{\lambda\mu}\left(c_{\frac{\lambda(1-\mu)}{1-\lambda\mu}}(x,y),z\right)$ (for $\lambda\mu\neq 1$)

From this, it is possible to define an n-ary convex combination operation, parametrised by an n-tuple $(\lambda_1, \dots, \lambda_n)$, where $\sum_i\lambda_i = 1$.

== Examples ==
Any real affine space is a convex space. More generally, any convex subset of a real affine space is a convex space.

== History ==
Convex spaces have been independently invented many times and given different names, dating back at least to Stone (1949). They were also studied by Neumann (1970) and Świrszcz (1974), among others.

Herstein and Milnor (1953) used convex spaces to prove the Mixture-space theorem.
