= Trade-off talking rational economic person =

Term denoting the human agent of economic decisions

Trade-off talking rational economic person (TOTREP) is one term, among others, used to denote, in the field of choice analysis, the rational, human agent of economic decisions.

== Origin of the term ==
The term was first used notably in David M. Kreps' Notes on the Theory of Choice (1988). Kreps, in his preface, acknowledges Mike Harrison for first using the acronym Totrep. In his work on the theory of choice, Michael Allingham characterizes the notion "denoted by TOTREP" as something "both to admire and worry about". Studies of the concept of the Trade-off Talking Rational Economic Person are now routinely conducted in the related fields of theory of choice, the mathematics of decision making, etc.

== Attributes ==
Totrep denotes an agent of economic decisions with strict preferences. The setting of the preference relations presumes that

- One, single person, i.e. Totrep, is making choices;
- A finite set of choices of possible outcomes is proposed, each associated with a defined or undefined probability of happening; the sum of probabilities equals 1;
- Totrep's preferences are defined axiomatically among the choices proposed;
- The representation of Totrep's preferences is stated through a utility function, which is typically a function from Totrep's set of choice to real numbers;
- The axioms defining Totrep's preferences must be both sufficient (if axioms hold, then representation is possible) and necessary (if representation holds, then axioms must hold); and finally
- The axioms are consistent (axioms can be satisfied simultaneously), independent (no subset of axioms implies the others, i.e. there is no overlap), and intuitive (easy to understand).

== Ethical considerations ==
In attempts to legitimatize economic theory as ethical, the question was asked about how to "teach or preach to economists or ethicists how to become more ethical". In this, social scientist Kjell Hausken posits the notion that, "if acting virtuously contributes to a character or personality which subsequently and indirectly influences economic [agent]'s reputation beneficially in the long run, then this action is to be recommended if the long-term benefit of the beneficial reputation outweighs the short-term benefit of a more deceitful or vicious action." Hausken observes that, the "ethical economic [agent]" is actually "a trade-off talking rational economic person", who constantly carries out "a cost–benefit analysis where reputation is a relevant input, constantly focusing on her real interests in a broad sense, and constantly thinking long term."

== Empirical objections ==
Empirical research, from the 1970s onwards (research that eventually established the field of behavioral economics), showed that the Totrep model of rationality cannot be safely considered as representative of real-life human affairs.

Kreps himself initially describes the models of choice presented in his book as both normative and descriptive but, in the final chapter of his book, where he briefly outlines the paradoxes of Allais (1953) and Ellsberg (1961), ultimately acknowledges that Totrep modelling should be presumed to be merely normative, since the "evidence [shows] individuals are very poor intuitive statisticians" and "use heuristic procedures which sometimes bias their choices in ways that the standard models don't capture."

== See also ==
- Agency
- Decision theory
- Efficient market hypothesis
- Homo economicus
- Game theory
- Preference (economics)
- Prospect theory
- Rational expectations
- Spherical cow
