= Rational agent =

Entity that always performs optimal actions from given information

A rational agent or rational being is a person or entity that always aims to perform optimal actions based on given premises and information. A rational agent can be anything that makes decisions, typically a person, firm, machine, or software.

The concept of rational agents can be found in various disciplines such as artificial intelligence, cognitive science, decision theory, economics, ethics, game theory, and the study of practical reason.

== Economics ==
In reference to economics, rational agent refers to hypothetical consumers and how they make decisions in a free market. This concept is one of the assumptions made in neoclassical economic theory. The concept of economic rationality arises from a tradition of marginal analysis used in neoclassical economics. The idea of a rational agent is important to the philosophy of utilitarianism, as detailed by philosopher Jeremy Bentham's theory of the felicific calculus, also known as the hedonistic calculus.

The action a rational agent takes depends on:

- the preferences of the agent
- the agent's information of its environment, which may come from past experiences
- the actions, duties and obligations available to the agent
- the estimated or actual benefits and the chances of success of the actions.

In game theory and classical economics, it is often assumed that the actors, people, and firms are rational. However, the extent to which people and firms behave rationally is subject to debate. Economists often assume the models of rational choice theory and bounded rationality to formalize and predict the behavior of individuals and firms. Rational agents sometimes behave in manners that are counter-intuitive to many people, as in the traveler's dilemma.

=== Alternate theories ===
Neuroeconomics is a concept that uses neuroscience, social psychology and other fields of science to better understand how people make decisions. Unlike rational agent theory, neuroeconomics does not attempt to predict large-scale human behavior but rather how individuals make decisions in case-by-case scenarios.

== Artificial intelligence ==
Artificial intelligence has borrowed the term "rational agents" from economics to describe autonomous programs that are capable of goal directed behavior. Today there is a considerable overlap between AI research, game theory and decision theory. Rational agents in AI are closely related to intelligent agents, autonomous software programs that display intelligence.

== See also ==
=== Economics ===
- Agent (economics)
- Homo economicus
- TOTREP

=== Software ===
- AIXI
- Autonomous agent
- Intelligent agent
- Software agent
