= Andranik Tangian =

Soviet-German polymath (born 1952)

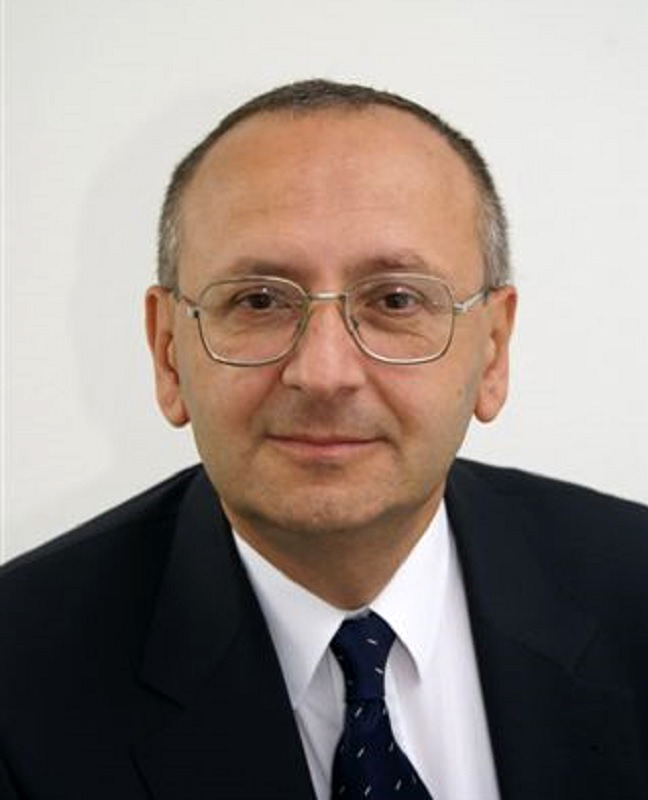
- Andranik Tangian, Düsseldorf, 2007
- Born: March 29, 1952 (age 74); Moscow
- Other names: Melik-Tangyan; Tanguiane
- Citizenship: Soviet Union; Russia; Germany
- Education: Moscow State University Faculty of Mechanics and Mathematics
- Known for: Mathematical theory of democracy Third Vote election method Criticism of flexicurity employment strategy Models of artificial perception of music
- Scientific career
- Fields: Applied mathematics Political economy Music theory
- Workplaces: Grenoble Institute of Technology; University of Hagen; Karlsruhe Institute of Technology

Andranik Semovich Tangian (Melik-Tangyan) (Russian: Андраник Семович Тангян (Мелик-Тангян)); born March 29, 1952) is a Soviet Armenian-German mathematician, political economist and music theorist. He is professor of the Institute for Economics (ECON) of the Karlsruhe Institute of Technology.

== Biography ==
As a self-taught composer, he debuted with orchestral music to the play The Last Trimester at the Moscow Central Children Theater in 1977.

Tangian spent the academic year 1990/91 at the University of Hagen and published his first monograph on the mathematical theory of democracy in 1991. During the next two academic years, Tangian has been visiting professor/researcher at the computer music studio ACROE–LIFIA of the Grenoble Institute of Technology, where he wrote a monograph on artificial perception and music.

From 1993 to 2002 Tangian ran a project on constructing objective functions for econometric decision models at the University of Hagen.

== Works ==
=== Mathematical theory of democracy ===
Combining the social choice and public choice approaches, Tangian's theory mathematically studies the fundamental concept to modern democracies – that of political representation. For this purpose, several indices of representativeness are introduced and used for both theoretical analysis and applications.

=== Third Vote election method ===
The method developed within the framework of the Mathematical theory of democracy assumes that instead of casting votes for candidates by name, electors give Yes/No-answers to political questions as raised in the candidates' manifestos. The balance of public opinion on these issues thus identified is then used to find the most representative candidates and form the most representative parliament.

=== Decision theory ===
For decision models, Tangian has developed several methods for constructing objective functions (= composite indices that embody decision-makers' preferences). In particular, they are applied to optimize budgets for 16 Westphalian universities and the European subsidies to 271 German regions for equalizing unemployment rates.

=== Flexicurity ===
Tangian's ten empirical models of flexicurity — the European policy intended to compensate the flexibilization of employment by social security measures — show that it fails to meet expectations. Alternatively, the job quality indicators developed within this research are proposed for the workplace tax that, by analogy with the green tax, should charge employers for bad working conditions considered "social pollution".

=== Inequality ===
According to Tangian, the current rise in inequality is caused, among other things, by the increasing productivity, which enables to underpay workers in so-called "labor equivalents", maintaining nevertheless an impression of fair pay, and use the surplus profit to enrich the upper strata of the society.

=== Artificial perception and automatic notation of music ===
The approach implements Tangian's principle of correlativity of perception for structuring data without knowing the structures, which is based on memory-saving representations. This model is used for polyphonic voice separation/chord recognition and tempo tracking under variable tempo.

=== Modeling interpretation ===
Tangian has proposed to segment the musical text with respect to the segment functions and show the segments using tempo envelopes, dynamics and other execution techniques. All of these are displayed in a conditional "orchestral score". This idea is also applied to theatrical performance and its notation.

=== Algorithmic composition ===
In the 2000s, Tangian has developed algorithms for finding rhythmic canons and fugues, i.e. polyphonic structures generated by one or two rhythmic patterns that in their interaction produce a regular pulse train, however, with no coinciding time events from different voices. As harmony algorithms, 2D and 3D proximity maps for major and minor keys and chords have been developed.
