= Lexicographic preferences =

Concept in economics

For the related mathematical concept, see Lexicographic order.

In economics, lexicographic preferences or lexicographic orderings describe comparative preferences where an agent prefers any amount of one good (X) to any amount of another (Y). Specifically, if offered several bundles of goods, the agent will choose the bundle that offers the most X, no matter how much Y there is. Only when there is a tie between bundles with regard to the number of units of X will the agent start comparing the number of units of Y across bundles. Lexicographic preferences extend utility theory analogously to the way that nonstandard infinitesimals extend the real numbers. With lexicographic preferences, the utility of certain goods is infinitesimal in comparison to others.

== Etymology ==
Lexicography refers to the compilation of dictionaries, and is meant to invoke the fact that a dictionary is organized alphabetically: with infinite attention to the first letter of each word, and only in the event of ties with attention to the second letter of each word, etc.

== Example ==
As an example, if for a given bundle (X;Y;Z) an agent orders his preferences according to the rule X>>Y>>Z, then the bundles {(5;3;3), (5;1;6), (3,5,3)} would be ordered, from most to least preferred:

1. 5;3;3
2. 5;1;6
3. 3;5;3
- Even though the first option contains fewer total goods than the second option, it is preferred because it has more Y. Note that the number of X's is the same, and so the agent is comparing Y's.
- Even though the third option has the same total goods as the first option, the first option is still preferred because it has more X.
- Even though the third option has far more Y than the second option, the second option is still preferred because it has more X.

== Discontinuity ==
A lexicographic preference relation is not a continuous relation. This is because, for a decreasing convergent sequence $x_n \rightarrow 0$ we have $(x_n,0)>(0,1)$, while the limit (0,0) is smaller than (0,1).

== Utility function representation ==
A distinctive feature of such lexicographic preferences is that a multivariate real domain of an agent's preferences does not map into a real-valued range. That is, there is no real-valued representation of a preference relation by a utility function, whether continuous or not. Lexicographic preferences are the classical example of rational preferences that are not representable by a utility function.

Proof: suppose by contradiction that there exists a utility function U representing lexicographic preferences, e.g. over two goods. Then U(x,1)>U(x,0) must hold, so the intervals [U(x,0),U(x,1)] must have a non-zero width. Moreover, since U(x,1)<U(z,1) whenever x<z, these intervals must be disjoint for all x. This is not possible for an uncountable set of x-values.

If there are a finite number of goods, and amounts can only be rational numbers, utility functions do exist, simply by taking 1/N to be the size of the infinitesimal, where N is sufficiently large, to approximate nonstandard numbers.

In terms of real valued utility, one would say that the utility of Y and Z is infinitesimal compared with X, and the utility of Z is infinitesimal compared to Y. Thus, lexicographic preferences can be represented by utility functions returning nonstandard real numbers.

== Equilibrium in economies with lexicographic preferences ==
If all agents have the same lexicographic preferences, then general equilibrium cannot exist because agents will not sell to each other (as long as price of the less preferred is more than zero). But if the price of the less wanted is zero, then all agents want an infinite amount of the good. Equilibrium cannot be attained with standard prices. The utilities are infinitesimal, but the prices are not. Allowing infinitesimal prices resolves this.

Lexicographic preferences can still exist with general equilibrium. For example,

- Different people have different bundles of lexicographic preferences such that different individuals value items in different orders.
- Some, but not all people have lexicographic preferences.
- Lexicographic preferences extend only to a certain quantity of the good.

The nonstandard (infinitesimal) equilibrium prices for exchange can be determined for lexicographic order using standard equilibrium methods, except using nonstandard reals as the range of both utilities and prices. All the theorems regarding existence of prices and equilibria extend to the case of nonstandard utilities, since the nonstandard reals form a conservative extension, meaning that any theorem which is true for reals can be extended to the nonstandard reals and remains true.

== See also ==
- Lexicographic optimization
