= Mental accounting =

Consumer behaviour model

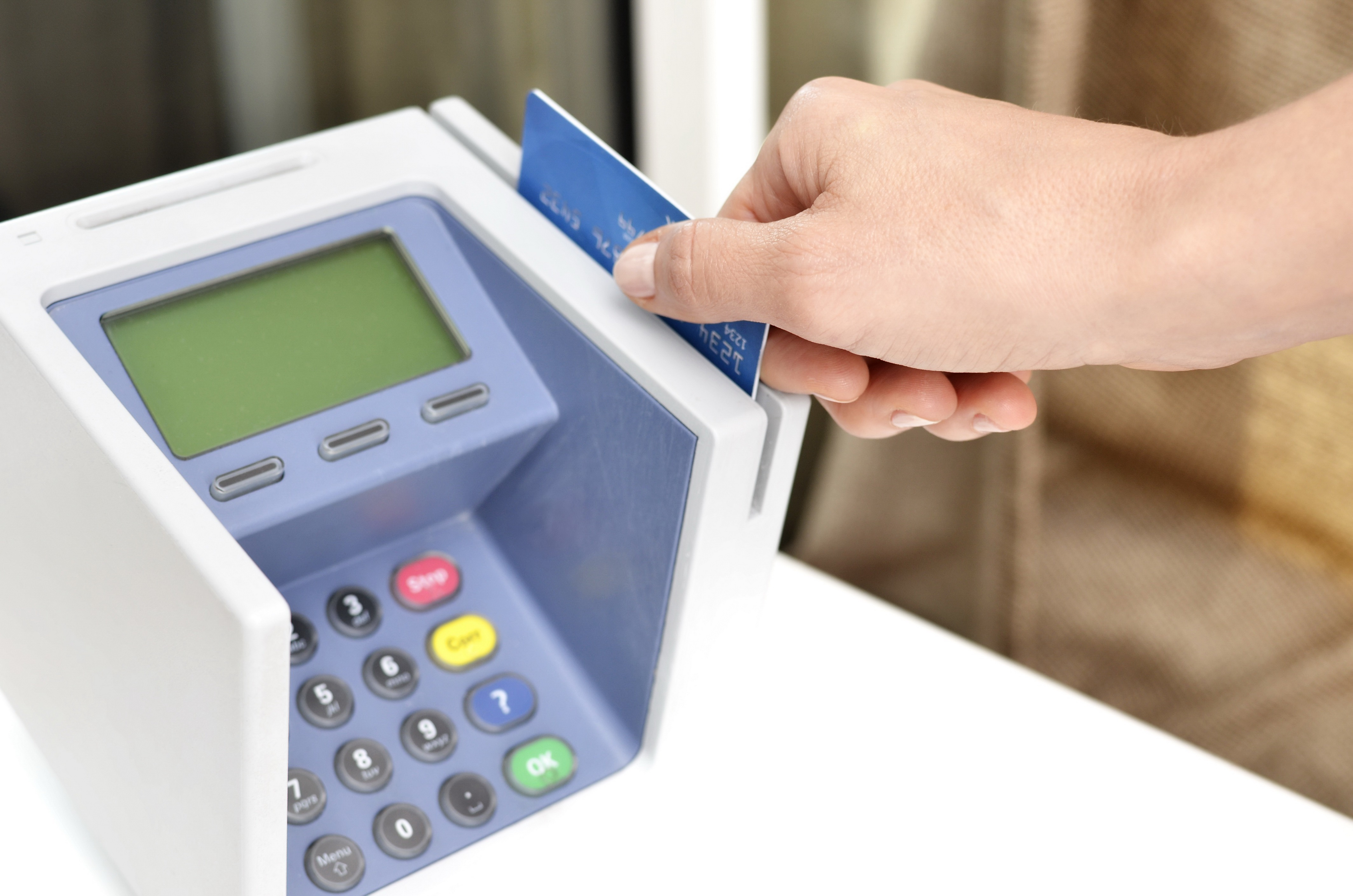
An example of mental accounting is people's willingness to pay more for goods when using credit cards than if they are paying with cash. This phenomenon is referred to as payment decoupling.

Mental accounting (or psychological accounting) is a model of consumer behaviour developed by Richard Thaler that attempts to describe the process whereby people code, categorize and evaluate economic outcomes. Mental accounting incorporates the economic concepts of prospect theory and transactional utility theory to evaluate how people create distinctions between their financial resources in the form of mental accounts, which in turn impacts the buyer decision process and reaction to economic outcomes. People are presumed to make mental accounts as a self control strategy to manage and keep track of their spending and resources. People budget money into mental accounts for savings (e.g., saving for a home) or expense categories (e.g., gas money, clothing, utilities). People also are assumed to make mental accounts to facilitate savings for larger purposes (e.g., a home or college tuition). Mental accounting can result in people demonstrating greater loss aversion for certain mental accounts, resulting in cognitive bias that incentivizes systematic departures from consumer rationality. Through an increased understanding of mental accounting differences in decision making based on different resources, and different reactions based on similar outcomes can be greater understood.

As Thaler puts it, "All organizations, from General Motors down to single person households, have explicit and/or implicit accounting systems. The accounting system often influences decisions in unexpected ways". Particularly, individual expenses will usually not be considered in conjunction with the present value of one's total wealth; they will be instead considered in the context of two accounts: the current budgetary period (this could be a monthly process due to bills, or yearly due to an annual income), and the category of expense. People can even have multiple mental accounts for the same kind of resource. A person may use different monthly budgets for grocery shopping and eating out at restaurants, for example, and constrain one kind of purchase when its budget has run out while not constraining the other kind of purchase, even though both expenditures draw on the same fungible resource (income).

One detailed application of mental accounting, the Behavioral Life Cycle Hypothesis posits that people mentally frame assets as belonging to either current income, current wealth or future income and this has implications for their behavior as the accounts are largely non-fungible and marginal propensity to consume out of each account is different.

== Utility, value and transaction ==
In mental accounting theory, the framing effect defines that the way a person subjectively frames a transaction in their mind will determine the utility they receive or expect. The concept of framing is adopted in prospect theory, which is commonly used by mental accounting theorists as the value function in their analysis (Richard Thaler Included). In Prospect Theory, the value function is concave for gains (implying an aversion to risk), indicating decreasing marginal utility with accumulation of gain. The value function is convex for losses (implying a risk-seeking attitude). A concave value function for gain incentivizes risk-averse behavior because marginal gain decreases relative increase in value. Conversely, a convex value function for losses means that the impact of a loss is more detrimental to a person than an equivalent gain, thus incentivizing risk-seeking behavior in order to avoid loss. These proponents of the value function portray the concept of loss aversion, which asserts that people are more likely to make decisions in order to minimize loss than to maximise gain.

Given the Prospect Theory framework, how do people interpret, or 'account for', multiple transactions/outcomes, of the format $(x, y)$? They can either view the outcomes jointly, and receive $Value(x+y)$, in which case the outcomes are integrated, or $Value(x) + Value(y)$, in which case we say that the outcomes are segregated. The choice to integrate or segregate multiple outcomes can be beneficial or detrimental to overall utility depending on the correctness of application. Due to the nature of our value function's different slopes for gains and losses, our utility is maximized in different ways, depending on how we code the four kinds of transactions $x$ and $y$ (as gains or as losses):

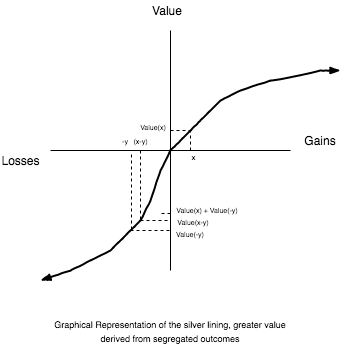
This graph shows how with two outcomes that in aggregate make up a mixed loss, more value is achieved by treating the outcomes separately. This is the "silver lining".

1) Multiple gains: $x$ and $y$ are both considered gains. Here, we see that $Value(x) + Value(y) > Value(x+y)$. Thus, we want to segregate multiple gains.

2) Multiple losses: $x$ and $y$ are both considered losses. Here, we see that $Value(-x) + Value(-y) < Value( -(x+y) )$. We want to integrate multiple losses.

3) Mixed gain: one of $x$ and $y$ is a gain and one is a loss, however the gain is the larger of the two. In this case, $Value(x) + Value(-y) < Value(x-y)$. Utility is maximized when we integrate a mixed gain.

4) Mixed loss: again, one of $x$ and $y$ is a gain and one is a loss, however the loss is now significantly larger than the gain. In this case, $Value(x) + Value(-y) >Value(x-y)$. Clearly, we don't want to integrate a mixed loss when the less is significantly larger than the gain. This is often referred to as a "silver lining", a reference to the folk maxim "every cloud has a silver lining". When the loss is just barely larger than the gain, integration may be preferred.

Integration and segregation of outcomes is a means of framing that can impact the overall utility derived from multiple outcomes. Mental accounting interprets the tendency of people to mentally segregate their financial resources into different categories. In the event of financial losses or gains in different mental accounts, people will be impacted differently than if the financial loss was integrated across their entire financial portfolio. In the event of multiple gain and mixed loss, mental accounting will segregate outcomes resulting in maximised utility. In the event of multiple losses and mixed gain, mental accounting will segregate outcomes resulting in minimized utility.

There are two values attached to any transaction - acquisition value and transaction value. Acquisition value is the money that one is ready to part with for physically acquiring some good. Transaction value is the value one attaches to having a good deal. If the price that one is paying is equal to the mental reference price for the good, the transaction value is zero. If the price is lower than the reference price, the transaction utility is positive. Total utility received from a transaction, then, is the sum of acquisition utility and transaction utility.

== Pain of Paying ==
A more proximal psychological mechanism through which mental accounting influences spending is through its influence on the pain of paying that is associated with spending money from a mental account. Pain of paying is a negative affective response associated with a financial loss. Prototypical examples are the unpleasant feeling that one experiences when watching the fare increase on a taximeter or at the gas pump. When considering an expense, consumers appear to compare the cost of the expense to the size of an account that it would deplete (e.g., numerator vs. denominator). A $30 t-shirt, for example, would be a subjectively larger expense when drawn from $50 in one's wallet than $500 in one's checking account. The larger the fraction, the more pain of paying the purchase appears to generate and the less likely consumers are to then exchange money for the good. Other evidence of the relation between pain of paying and spending include the lower debt held by consumers who report experiencing a higher pain of paying for the same goods and services than consumers who report experiencing less pain of paying.

== Main principles of mental accounts ==
Richard Thaler divided the concept mental accounting into two main principles; segregation of gains and losses, and account reference points. Both principles utilize concepts related to utility and pain of paying to interpret how people evaluate economic outcomes.

=== Segregation of gains and losses ===
A main principle of mental accounting is the assertion that people frame gains and losses by segregating into different mental accounts rather than integrating into their overall account. The impact of this tendency means that outcomes can be framed based on the context of a decision. In mental accounting the framing of a decision reduces from the overall account to a smaller segregated account which can incentivize purchase decisions. An example of this was posed by Thaler where people were more inclined to drive 20 minutes to save $5 on a $15 purchase than on a $125 purchase. The principle applies to mental accounting where if gains and losses are viewed relative to a smaller segregated account then the outcome is viewed differently.

=== Account reference points ===
Account reference points refer to the tendency for people to set a reference point on a current decision based on prior outcome in the same mental account. As a result the impact of prior outcomes integrate into the current decision when determining overall utility. An example was posed by Thaler where gamblers were more inclined to make risk-seeking bets on the last race of the day. This phenomenon was justified by the assertion that gamblers segregate the gains and losses from each day into separate accounts and integrate gains and losses for each day in an account. It can then be interpreted that end-of-day risk-seeking bets is an example of loss aversion where gamblers attempt to equalize their daily account.

== Practical implications ==
Since the inception of the concept, mental accounting has been applied to interpret consumer behavior particularly in the contexts of online shopping, consumer reward points, public taxation policy.

=== Psychology ===
Mental accounting is subject to many logical fallacies and cognitive biases, which hold many implications such as overspending.

=== Credit cards and cash payments ===
Another example of mental accounting is the greater willingness to pay for goods when using credit cards than cash. Swiping a credit card prolongs the payment to a later date (when we pay our monthly bill) and integrates it to a large existing sum (our bill to that point). This delay causes the payment to stick in our memory less clearly and saliently. Furthermore, the payment is no longer perceived in isolation; rather, it is seen as a (relatively) small increase of an already large credit card bill. For example, it might be a change from $120 to $125, instead of a regular, out-of-pocket $5 cost. And as we can see from our value function, this V(-$125) – V(-$120) is smaller than V(-$5), thus the pain of paying is reduced.

=== Marketing ===
Mental accounting can be useful for marketers predict customer response to bundling of pricing and segregation of products. People respond more positively to incentives and costs when gains are segregated, losses are integrated, marketers segregate net losses (the silver lining principle), and integrate net gains. Automotive dealers, for example, benefit from these principles when they bundle optional features into a single price but segregate each feature included in the bundle (e.g. velvet seat covers, aluminum wheels, anti-theft car lock). Cellular phone companies can use principles of mental accounting when deciding how much to charge consumers for a new smartphone and to give them for their trade-in. When the cost of the phone is large and the value of the phone to be traded in is low, it is better to charge consumers a slightly higher price for the phone and return that money to them as a higher value on their trade in. Conversely, when the cost of the phone and the value of the trade-in are more comparable, because consumers are loss averse, it is better to charge them less for the new phone and offer them less for the trade-in.

=== Public policy ===
Mental accounting can also be utilized in public economics and public policy. Inherently, the way that people (and therefore tax-payers and voters) perceive decisions and outcomes will be influenced by their process of mental accounting. Policy-makers and public economists could potentially apply mental accounting concepts when crafting public systems, trying to understand and identify market failures, redistribute wealth or resources in a fair way, reduce the saliency of sunk costs, limiting or eliminating the Free-rider problem, or even just when delivering bundles of multiple goods or services to taxpayers. The following examples exist where mental accounting applied to public policy and programs produced positive outcomes.

A good example of the importance of considering mental accounting while crafting public policy is demonstrated by authors Justine Hastings and Jesse Shapiro in their analysis of the SNAP (Supplemental Nutritional Assistance Program). They "argue that these findings are not consistent with households treating SNAP funds as fungible with non-SNAP funds, and we support this claim with formal tests of fungibility that allow different households to have different consumption functions" Put differently, their data supports Thaler's (and the concept of mental accounting's) claim that the principle of fungibility is often violated in practice. Furthermore, they find SNAP to be very effective, calculating a marginal propensity to consume SNAP-eligible food (MPCF) out of benefits received by SNAP of 0.5 to 0.6. This is much higher than the MPCF out of cash transfers, which is usually around 0.1.

The implications of taxation policy on taxpayers was examined through mental accounting principles in Optimal Taxation with Behavioral Insights. The research paper applied the ideology of the three pillars of optimal taxation, and incorporated mental accounting concepts (as well as misperceptions and internalities). Outcomes included novel economic insights, including application of nudges present in optimal taxation frameworks, and challenging the Diamond-Mirrlees productive efficiency result and the Atkinson-Stiglitz uniform commodity taxation proposition, finding they are more likely to fail with behavioral agents.

In the paper Public vs. Private Mental Accounts: Experimental Evidence from Savings Groups in Colombia, it was demonstrated that mental accounting can be exploited to help nudge people towards saving more. The study found that publicly creating a savings goal greatly increased the savings rate of participants when compared to the control and those who set savings goals privately. The power of the labeling effect was observed to vary based on the savings success history of the participants.

== See also ==
- Decision making
- Behavioral economics
- Framing effect (psychology)
- Micropayment
- Preference
- Psychological pricing
- Transaction cost
- Sunk cost
