= King–Plosser–Rebelo preferences =

In economics, King–Plosser–Rebelo preferences are a particular functional form of utility that is used in many macroeconomic models and dynamic stochastic general equilibrium models. Having originally been proposed in an article that appeared in the Journal of Monetary Economics in 1988, the corresponding technical appendix detailing their derivation has only been published in 2002.

Denote consumption with C, leisure with L and the absolute value of the inverse of the intertemporal elasticity of substitution in consumption with $\sigma _c$. Strict concavity of the utility function implies $\sigma _c > 0$. For $0 < \sigma _c < 1$ or $\sigma _c > 1$ the utility function has the multiplicatively separable form

$u\left( {C,L} \right) = \frac{1}{{1 - {\sigma _c}}}{C^{1 - {\sigma _c}}}v\left( L \right)$

where $v\left( L \right)$ is increasing and concave if $0 < \sigma _c < 1$ or decreasing and convex if $\sigma _c > 1$. Further restrictions are required to assure overall concavity of the momentarily utility function. In the limit case of $\sigma _c = 1$ the resulting preferences specification is additively separable and given by

$u\left( {C,L} \right) = \ln {C_t} + v\left( L \right)$

where $v\left( L \right)$ is increasing and concave.

The reason for the prevalence of this preference specification in macroeconomics is that they are compatible with balanced growth along the optimal steady state. Hence, they are used in many dynamic stochastic general equilibrium models, which are typically derived from the neoclassical growth model. The reason for their compatibility with balanced growth is twofold. First, having a constant interest rate in steady state, the growth rate of marginal utility must be constant, which is the case here. Second, having a finite time endowment, balanced growth together with an optimal choice of labor by the agents implies that income and substitution effect of the increase in real wages due to productivity increases must cancel each other.

== Shortcut to achieve balanced growth compatibility ==
To have additively separable preferences along with balanced growth, some studies use the shortcut of introducing a scaling factor containing the level of labor augmenting technology before the leisure term. An example of such a utility function would be $u\left( C,L \right) = \frac{1}{1 - \sigma _c}C^{1 -\sigma _c} - z^{1 - \sigma _c}\frac{\left( 1 - L \right)^{1 + \kappa }}{1 + \kappa }$

Where $\kappa$ denotes the inverse of the Frisch elasticity of labor supply and z is the level of labor augmenting technology.

== Relationship to other common macroeconomic preference types ==
KPR-preferences are one polar case nested in Jaimovich–Rebelo preferences. The latter allow to freely scale the wealth effect on the labor supply. The other polar case is the Greenwood–Hercowitz–Huffman preferences, where the wealth effect on the labor supply is completely shut off. However, this naturally implies that they are incompatible with a balanced growth path.
