= End-of-the-day betting effect =

Cognitive bias observed at the end of a gambling session

The end-of-the-day betting effect is a cognitive bias reflected in the tendency for bettors to take gambles with higher risk and higher reward at the end of their betting session to try to make up for losses. William McGlothlin (1956) and Mukhtar Ali (1977) first discovered this effect after observing the shift in betting patterns at horserace tracks. Mcglothlin and Ali noticed that people are significantly more likely to prefer longshots to conservative bets on the last race of the day. They found that the movement towards longshots, and away from favorites, is so pronounced that some studies show that conservatively betting on the favorite to show (to finish first, second, or third) in the last race is a profitable bet despite the track’s take.

== Explanation ==
Expected utility hypothesis cannot explain the shift in risk preferences across the day if bettors integrate their wealth because the last race of the day is not fundamentally different from the first. Prospect theory can explain the shift by assuming people open a mental account at the beginning of the day, close it at the end, and hate closing an account in the red.

The end-of-the-day betting effect is consistent with the risk aversion/risk seeking behaviors associated with prospect theory, which state that people are more likely to be risk averse in the case of gains and risk seeking in the case of losses. Prospect theory claims that people begin with zero daily profit as a reference point and gamble in the domain of losses to break even. Because the racetrack takes a hefty bite out of each dollar, most people are down money when the last races near. Anything below this target is regarded as a loss and triggers risk-seeking behavior in an attempt to break even. Diminishing sensitivity to successive losses means that the cost of the last bet is relatively trivial compared to what has already been spent. Betters refrain from making bets that would not recoup their losses if successful.

== Example ==
John and Bob go to the casino to play roulette. After two hours of playing their wives tell them that they must leave after one more spin. John is up $200. Bob is down $320. The end-of-the-day betting effect says that John is more likely to make a low risk bet, such as betting on red or black (1:1 odds), while Bob is more likely to make a bet that can recoup his losses if he is successful, such as betting $10 on 3 single numbers (35:1 odds each).
