= GHH =

GHH may refer to:

- Garhi Harsaru Junction railway station, in Haryana, India
- Ghale language
- Glasgow Homeopathic Hospital, in Scotland
- Greenwood–Hercowitz–Huffman preferences
- Gutehoffnungshütte, a German manufacturing company
