= Jaimovich–Rebelo preferences =

Jaimovich–Rebelo preferences refer to a utility function that allows to parameterize the strength of short-run wealth effects on the labor supply, originally developed by Nir Jaimovich and Sergio Rebelo in their 2009 article Can News about the Future Drive the Business Cycle?

Let $C_t$ denote consumption and let $N_{t}$ denote hours worked at period $t$. The instantaneous utility has the form

$u\left( {C_{t},N_{t}} \right) = \frac{ \left( C_{t} - \psi N_{t}^{\theta}X_{t} \right)^{1-\sigma}-1}{1-\sigma},$

where

$X_{t} = C_{t}^{\gamma}X_{t-1}^{1-\gamma}.$

It is assumed that $\theta>1$, $\psi>0$, and $\sigma>0$.

The agents in the model economy maximize their lifetime utility, $U$, defined over sequences of consumption and hours worked,

$U = E_{0} \sum_{t=0}^{\infty} \beta^{t}u\left( {C_{t},N_{t}} \right),$

where $E_{0}$ denotes the expectation conditional on the information available at time zero, and the agents internalize the dynamics of $X_t$ in their maximization problem.

== Relationship to other common macroeconomic preference types ==
Jaimovich–Rebelo preferences nest the KPR preferences and the GHH preferences.

=== KPR preferences ===
When $\gamma = 1$, the scaling variable $X_{t}$ reduces to $X_{t} = C_{t},$ and the instantaneous utility simplifies to

$u\left( {C_{t},N_{t}} \right) = \frac{ \left( C_{t}\left( 1 - \psi N_{t}^{\theta} \right) \right)^{1-\sigma}-1}{1-\sigma},$

corresponding to the KPR preferences.

=== GHH preferences and balanced growth path ===
When $\gamma \rightarrow 0$, and if the economy does not present exogenous growth, then the scaling variable $X_{t}$ reduces to a constant $X_{t} = X>0,$ and the instantaneous utility simplifies to

$u\left( {C_{t},N_{t}} \right) = \frac{ \left( C_{t} - \psi X N_{t}^{\theta} \right)^{1-\sigma}-1}{1-\sigma},$

corresponding to the original GHH preferences, in which the wealth effect on the labor supply is completely shut off.

Note however that the original GHH preferences are not compatible with a balanced growth path, while the Jaimovich–Rebelo preferences are compatible with a balanced growth path for $0<\gamma \leq 1$. To reconcile these facts, first note that the Jaimovich–Rebelo preferences are compatible with a balanced growth path for $0<\gamma \leq 1$ because the scaling variable, $X_{t}$, grows at the same rate as the labor augmenting technology.

Let $z_{t}$ denote the level of labor augmenting technology. Then, in a balanced growth path, consumption $C_{t}$ and the scaling variable $X_{t}$ grow at the same rate as $z_{t}$. When $\gamma \rightarrow 0$, the stationary variable $\frac{X_{t}}{z_{t}}$ satisfies the relation

$\frac{X_{t}}{z_{t}} = \frac{X_{t-1}}{z_{t-1}}\frac{z_{t-1}}{z_{t}},$

which implies that

$X_{t} = X z_{t},$

for some constant $X>0$.

Then, the instantaneous utility simplifies to

$u\left( {C_{t},N_{t}} \right) = \frac{ \left( C_{t} - z_{t}\psi X N_{t}^{\theta} \right)^{1-\sigma}-1}{1-\sigma},$

consistent with the shortcut of introducing a scaling factor containing the level of labor augmenting technology before the hours worked term.
