= Description-experience gap =

The description-experience gap is a phenomenon in experimental behavioral studies of decision making. The gap refers to the observed differences in people's behavior depending on whether their decisions are made towards clearly outlined and described outcomes and probabilities or whether they simply experience the alternatives without having any prior knowledge of the consequences of their choices.

In both described and experienced choice tasks, the experimental task usually involves selecting between one of two possible choices that lead to certain outcomes. The outcome could be a gain or a loss and the probabilities of these outcomes vary. Of the two choices, one is probabilistically safer than the other. The other choice, then, offers a comparably improbable outcome. The specific payoffs or outcomes of the choices, in terms of the magnitude of their potential gains and losses, vary from study to study.

== Description ==
Description-based alternatives or prospects are those where much of the information regarding each choice is clearly stated. That is, the participant is shown the potential outcomes for both choices as well as the probabilities of all the outcomes within each choice. Typically, feedback is not given after a choice is selected. That is, the participant is not shown what consequences their selections led to. Prospect theory guides much of what is currently known regarding described choices.

According to prospect theory, the decision weight of described prospects is considered differently depending on whether the prospects have a high or low probability and the nature of the outcomes. Specifically, people's decisions differ depending on whether the described prospects are framed as gains or losses, and whether the outcomes are sure or probable.

Prospects are termed as gains when the two possible choices both offer a chance to receive a certain reward. Losses are those where the two possible choices both result in a reduction of a certain resource. An outcome is said to be sure when its probability is absolutely certain, or very close to 1. A probable outcome is one that is comparably more unlikely than the sure outcome. For described prospects, people tend to assign a higher value to sure or more probable outcomes when the choices involve gains; this is known as the certainty effect. When the choices involve losses, people tend to assign a higher value to the more improbable outcome; this is called the reflection effect because it leads to the opposite result of the certainty effect.

== Experience ==
Previous studies focusing on description-based prospects suffered from one drawback: the lack of external validity. In the natural environment, people's decisions must be made without a clear description of the probabilities of the alternatives. Instead, decisions must be made by drawing upon past experiences. In experience-based studies, then, the outcomes and probabilities of the two possible choices are not initially presented to the participants. Instead, participants must sample from these choices, and they can only learn the outcomes from feedback after making their choices. Participants can only estimate the probabilities of the outcomes based on experiencing the outcomes.

Contrary to the results obtained by prospect theory, people tended to underweight the probabilities of rare outcomes when they made decisions from experience. That is, they in general tended to choose the more probable outcome much more often than the rare outcomes; they behaved as if the rare outcomes were more unlikely than they really were. The effect has been observed in studies involving repeated and small samples of choices. However, people tended to choose the riskier choice when deciding from experience for tasks that are framed in terms of gains, and this, too, is in contrast with decisions made from description.

As demonstrated above, decisions appear to be made very differently depending on whether choices are made from experience or description; that is, a description-experience gap has been demonstrated in decision making studies. The example of the reverse reflection effect aptly demonstrates the nature of the gap. Recall that description-based prospects lead to the reflection effect: people are risk averse for gains and risk seeking for losses. However, experience-based prospects results in a reversal of the reflection effect such that people become risk seeking for gains and risk averse for losses. More specifically, the level of risk-taking behavior towards gains for participants in the experience task is virtually identical to the level of risk-taking towards losses for participants in the description task. The same effect is observed for gains versus losses in experience and description tasks. There are a few explanations and factors that contribute to the gap; some of which will be discussed below.

One factor that may contribute to the gap is the nature of the sampling task. In a sampling paradigm, people are allowed to respond to a number of prospects. Presumably, they form their own estimations for the probabilities of the outcomes through sampling. However, some studies rely on people making decisions for a small sample of prospects. Due to the small samples, people may not even experience the low probability event, and this might influence peoples' underweighting of the rare events. However, description-based studies involve making the exact probabilities known to the participant. Since the participants here are immediately made aware of the rareness of an event, they are unlikely to undersample rare events.

The results from experience-based studies may be the result of a recency effect. The recency effect shows that greater weight or value is assigned to more recent events. Given that rare events are uncommon, the more common events are more likely to take recency and therefore be weighted more than rare events. The recency effect, then, may be responsible for the underweighting of rare events in decisions made from experience. Given that description-based studies usually involving responding to a limited number of trials or only one trial, recency effects likely do not have as much of an influence on decision making in these studies or may even be entirely irrelevant.

Another variable which may be driving the results for the experience-based decisions paradigm is a basic tendency to avoid delayed outcomes: alternatives with positive rare events are on average advantageous only in the long term; while alternatives with negative rare events are on average disadvantageous in the long term. Hence, focusing on short term outcomes produces underweighting of rare events. Consistent with this notion, it has been found the increasing the short term temptation (e.g., by showing outcomes from all options; or foregone payoffs) increases the underweighting of rare events in decisions from experience

Since experience-based studies include multiple trials, participants must learn about the outcomes of the available choices. The participants must base their decisions on previous outcomes, so they must therefore rely on memory when learning the outcomes and their probabilities. Biases for more salient memories, then, may be the reason for greater risk seeking in gains choices in experience-based studies. The assumption here is that a more improbable but greater reward may produce a more salient memory.

To reiterate, prospect theory offers sound explanations for how people behave towards description-based prospects. However, the results from experience-based prospects tend to show opposite forms of responding. In described prospects, people tend to overweight the extreme outcomes such that they expect these probabilities to be more likely than they really are. Whereas in experienced prospects, people tend to underweight the probability of the extreme outcomes and therefore judge them as being even less likely to occur.

A highly relevant example of the description-experience gap has been illustrated: the difference in opinions on vaccination between doctors and patients. Patients who learn about vaccination are usually exposed to only information regarding the probabilities of the side effects of the vaccines so they are likely to overweight the likelihood of these side effects. Although doctors learn about the same probabilities and descriptions of the side effects, their perspective is also shaped by experience: doctors have the direct experience of vaccinating patients and they are more likely to recognize the unlikelihood of the side effects. Due to the different ways in which doctors and patients learn about the side effects, there is potential disagreement on the necessity and safety of vaccination.

Typically in natural settings, however, peoples' awareness of the probabilities of certain outcomes and their prior experience cannot be separated when they make decisions that involve risk. In gambling settings, for instance, players can participate in a game with some level of understanding of the probabilities of the possible outcomes and what specifically the outcomes lead to. For example, players know that there are six sides to a die, and that each side has a one in six chance of being rolled. However, a player's decisions in the game must also be influenced by his or her past experiences of playing the game.

== See also ==
- Decision theory
- Prospect theory
