= Frisch elasticity of labor supply =

Responsiveness of hours worked to the wage rate

The Frisch elasticity of labor supply captures the price elasticity of supply to the wage rate, given a constant marginal utility of wealth. Marginal utility is constant for risk-neutral individuals according to microeconomics. In other words, the Frisch elasticity measures the substitution effect of a change in the wage rate on labor supply, the willingness to work when wage is changed. The higher the Frisch elasticity, the more hours willing are people to work if the wage increases. This concept was proposed by the economist Ragnar Frisch after whom the elasticity of labor supply is named.

The Frisch elasticity can be also referred to as "λ-constant elasticity", where λ denotes marginal utility of wealth, or also in some macro literature it is referred to as "macro elasticity" as macroeconomic models are set in terms of the Frisch elasticity, while the term "micro elasticity" is used to refer to the intensive margin elasticity of hours conditional on employment.

The Frisch elasticity of labor supply is important for economic analysis and for understanding business cycle fluctuations. It also controls intertemporal substitution responses to fluctuations of wage. Moreover, it determines the reaction of effects to fiscal policy interventions, taxation or money transfers.

== Definition ==
Let $h_t$ denote a worker's labor supply in a given time $t$, $w_t$ their wage, and $\lambda_t$ their marginal utility from wealth. The Frisch elasticity (FE) is given by $FE=\frac{\partial h_t}{\partial w_t} \frac{w_t}{h_t} = \frac{\partial \log h_t }{\partial \log w_t}\Biggl|_{\lambda_t = const}$.

The overall effect of the Frisch elasticity can be distinguished into extensive and intensive. The extensive effect can be explained as a decision whether to work at all. The intensive effect refers to a decision of an employee on the number of hours to work.

Under certain circumstances, a constant marginal utility of wealth implies a constant marginal utility of consumption. Moreover, the Frisch elasticity corresponds to the elasticity of substitution of labor supply.

=== Difference with the general concept of elasticity of labor supply ===
"Elasticity of labor supply" in general refers to the responsiveness of labor supply to changes in the wage rate, measured as the percentage change in the quantity of labor supplied divided by the percentage change in the wage rate. The Frisch elasticity of labor supply is a specific type of elasticity of labor supply that considers the intertemporal substitution of work effort, that is, it takes into account the effects of temporary changes in income on the amount of work that people are willing to supply.

== Applications ==
Governments can use the Frisch elasticity to determine the effectiveness of policies aimed at increasing employment and reducing unemployment. For example, a policy that increases wages in a certain sector can increase labor supply, but the extent of the increase will depend on the Frisch elasticity. Similarly, policies aimed at reducing taxes or increasing welfare benefits can also have an impact on the Frisch elasticity of labor supply.

Moreover, the Frisch elasticity can help policymakers understand the impact of technological change on the labor market. Technological change can increase the productivity of labor, which can lead to an increase in wages. However, it can also lead to a reduction in the demand for labor in certain sectors, which can lead to unemployment. The Frisch elasticity can help policymakers understand the extent to which workers will respond to changes in wages.

== Value ==
Meta-analyses of the literature find that the Frisch elasticity is positive, meaning that an increase in wages leads to an increase in labor supply. If instead the Frisch elasticity were, for example, 0.5, a 10% increase in wages would lead to a 5% increase in labor supply, measured as the amount of hours worked. A Frisch elasticity of 0 would indicate that workers do not respond to changes in wages, while a Frisch elasticity of 1 would mean that workers are highly responsive to changes in wages. The magnitude of the Frisch elasticity is typically between 0 and 1, indicating that the increase in labor supply is less than proportional to the increase in wages.

Estimates of price elasticity of labor supply range around 0.7-1.8 when considering labor force participation rate.

=== Heterogeneity ===
Values of the Frisch elasticity vary depending on the population being analyzed. Different groups of workers may have different Frisch elasticities due to differences in preferences, job opportunities, and other factors. For example, workers with higher levels of education and training may have higher Frisch elasticities than workers with lower levels of education and training because they may have more flexibility in their job options and may be able to switch between different types of jobs more easily. Similarly, workers in certain industries or occupations may have higher Frisch elasticities than workers in other industries or occupations. For instance, workers in industries that experience rapid technological change may have higher Frisch elasticities because they are more likely to be affected by fluctuations in wages due to changes in technology. Moreover, other factors such as income level, gender, and age can also affect the Frisch elasticity of labor supply, and the direction of the effect is ex-ante unclear. For instance, low-income workers may have lower Frisch elasticities because they may have fewer job opportunities or may face greater financial constraints that make it harder for them to adjust their labor supply in response to wage changes. Conversely, low-income workers may instead more likely to have to work to make ends meet, and therefore may be more responsive to changes in wages, leading to a higher Frisch elasticity. Women may also have different Frisch elasticities compared to men due to differences in labor market opportunities and social norms surrounding work and family. Older workers may have lower Frisch elasticities than younger workers because they may have stronger preferences for leisure time or may be less willing or able to retrain for new jobs.

Finally, countries with lower levels of social welfare provision tend to have higher Frisch elasticities, arguably because workers in countries with more limited social welfare benefits may have fewer alternatives to working and may be more willing to supply labor even when wages are low. In contrast, workers in countries with more comprehensive social welfare systems may have more options and be less likely to work in low-wage jobs.

== See also ==
- King–Plosser–Rebelo preferences
- Labor supply
- Elasticity of substitution
- Labor economics
- Marginal revenue productivity theory of wages
- Human capital theory
