= Greenwood–Hercowitz–Huffman preferences =

Functional form of utility

Greenwood–Hercowitz–Huffman preferences are a particular functional form of utility developed by Jeremy Greenwood, Zvi Hercowitz, and Gregory Huffman, in their 1988 paper Investment, Capacity Utilization, and the Real Business Cycle. It describes the macroeconomic impact of technological changes that affect the productivity of new capital goods. The paper also introduced the notions of investment-specific technological progress and capacity utilization into modern macroeconomics.

GHH preferences have Gorman form.

Often macroeconomic models assume that agents' utility is additively separable in consumption and labor. I.e., frequently the period utility function is something like

$$u(c,l) = \frac{c^{1-\gamma}}{1-\gamma}- \psi \frac{l^{1+\theta}}{1+\theta}$$

where $c$ is consumption and $l$ is labor (e.g., hours worked). Note that this is separable in that the utility (loss) from working does not directly affect the utility (gain or loss) from consumption, i.e. the cross-derivative of utility with respect to consumption and labor is 0.

GHH preferences might instead have a form like:

$$u(c,l) = \frac{1}{1-\gamma}\left(c - \psi \frac{l^{1+\theta}}{1+\theta} \right)^{1-\gamma}$$

where now consumption and labor are not additively separable in the same way. For an agent with this utility function, the amount she/he works will actually affect the amount of utility she/he receives from consumption, i.e. the cross-derivative of utility with respect to consumption and labor is unequal to 0.

More generally, the preferences are of the form

$$u(c,l) = U\left(c - G(l)\right), U'>0, U''<0, G'>0, G''>0.$$

The first order condition of $u(c,l)$ with respect $l$ is given by

$$U'\left(c - G(l)\right)\left(\frac{dc}{dl} - G'(l) \right) = 0$$

which implies

$$\frac{dc}{dl} = G'(l).$$

As $dc/dl$ is typically just a wage $w$, this means the labor choice $l$ is a function of only the wage and has a closed form with $l = G'^{-1}(w)$. As a result, the preferences are exceptionally convenient to work with. Moreover, as the marginal rate of substitution is independent of consumption and only depends on the real wage, there is no wealth effect on the labor supply. Using preference without a wealth effect on the labor supply might help to explain the aggregate economic behavior following news shocks, and government spending shocks. Their use is also very common in open macro studies.

== Generalization: Jaimovich–Rebelo preferences ==
GHH preferences are not consistent with a balanced growth path. Jaimovich and Rebelo proposed a preference specification that allows scaling the short-run wealth effect on the labor supply. The two polar cases are the standard King–Plosser–Rebelo preferences and the GHH-preferences.
