= Equity risk =

Equity risk is "the financial risk involved in holding equity in a particular investment." Equity risk is a type of market risk that applies to investing in shares. The market price of stocks fluctuates all the time, depending on supply and demand. The risk of losing money due to a reduction in the market price of shares is known as equity risk.

The measure of risk used in the equity markets is typically the standard deviation of a security's price over a number of periods. The standard deviation will delineate the normal fluctuations one can expect in that particular security above and below the mean, or average. However, since most investors would not consider fluctuations above the average return as "risk," some economists prefer other means of measuring it.

Equity risk premium (ERP) is defined as "excess return that an individual stock or the overall stock market provides over a risk-free rate." equity risk premium (ERP) is the difference between the return on a market portfolio or a stock with average market risk and the risk-free rate of return. From this definition, it is clear that the market average equity return is the expected "threshold" for investors to engage in investment activities in the market, and if the current return is lower than the average return, rational investors will abandon it in favor of higher yielding investments.

$Equity Risk Premium = Return on the Market (Rm) - Risk Free Rate (Rf)$

The level of risk is closely proportional to the equity risk premium. The wider the difference between the stock's return and the risk-free rate, and thus the higher the premium, the higher the risk. The equity risk premium can also be used as a portfolio indicator by investors. According to Gaurav Doshi, CEO of IIFL Wealth Portfolio Managers, the bigger the equity risk premium, the more probable investors will shift their portfolios away from bonds and toward equities. In the long term, any investor that takes a bigger risk is rewarded.

This excess compensates investors for taking on the relatively higher risk of the equity market. The size of the premium can vary as the risk in the stock, or just the related whole market in general, increases. For example, higher risks have a higher premium. The concept of this is to entice investors to take on riskier investments. A key component in this is the risk-free rate, which is quoted as "the rate on longer-term government bonds." These are considered risk free because there is a low chance that the government will default on its loans. However, the investment in stocks isn't guaranteed, because businesses often suffer downturns or go out of business.

Over the long term, the equity risk premium forecasts that equities would outperform risk-free investments. By deducting the projected expected return of risk-free bonds from the estimated expected return of stocks, the risk premium can be calculated. For example, if the return on a stock is 17% and the risk-free rate over the same period of time is 9%, then the equity-risk premium would be 8% for the stock over that period of time.

Some analysts use "implied equity risk premium," a forward-looking view of ERP. To calculate the implied equity risk premium for the market, one would forecast an expectation of future market returns and subtract the risk-free rate appropriate for the forecasting period.

Importance: -Favors investments in 1. Helps in the selection of financial assets. In individual asset selection, investors can make asset allocation decisions, i.e. how to allocate their funds to equities, fixed income bonds or other assets, based on the relevant risk and return estimates obtained and comparing the level of risk premiums of various assets, which helps to improve the efficiency of investors' decisions. 2. It helps project investment analysis. In project investment, the Capital Asset Pricing Model (CAPM) is usually used to calculate the expected rate of return of a project. -Facilitates forecasting ERP usually determines the expected return on common stock. If ERP decreases, the discount rate of the investment decreases and causes the stock price to increase. The stock market is a leading indicator of macroeconomic performance, so by determining the trend of the ERP and stock price movements in the stock market, macroeconomic trends can be predicted.

== See also ==
- Risk premium
