= Hyperbolic absolute risk aversion =

In finance, economics, and decision theory, hyperbolic absolute risk aversion (HARA) refers to a type of risk aversion that is particularly convenient to model mathematically and to obtain empirical predictions from. It refers specifically to a property of von Neumann–Morgenstern utility functions, which are typically functions of final wealth (or some related variable), and which describe a decision-maker's degree of satisfaction with the outcome for wealth. The final outcome for wealth is affected both by random variables and by decisions. Decision-makers are assumed to make their decisions (such as, for example, portfolio allocations) so as to maximize the expected value of the utility function.

Notable special cases of HARA utility functions include the quadratic utility function, the exponential utility function, and the isoelastic utility function.

== Definition ==
A utility function is said to exhibit hyperbolic absolute risk aversion if and only if the level of risk tolerance $T(W)$—the reciprocal of absolute risk aversion $A(W)$—is a linear function of wealth W:

$$T(W) = \frac{1}{A(W)} = \frac{W}{1-\gamma} + \frac{b}{a},$$

where A(W) is defined as –U "(W) / U '(W). A utility function U(W) has this property, and thus is a HARA utility function, if and only if it has the form

$$U(W) = \frac{1-\gamma}{\gamma} \left(\frac{aW}{1-\gamma} + b\right)^{\gamma}$$

with restrictions on wealth and the parameters such that $a>0$ and $b + \frac{aW}{1-\gamma} > 0.$ For a given parametrization, this restriction puts a lower bound on W if $\gamma <1$ and an upper bound on W if $\gamma >1$. For the limiting case as $\gamma$ → 1, L'Hôpital's rule shows that the utility function becomes linear in wealth; and for the limiting case as $\gamma$ goes to 0, the utility function becomes logarithmic: $U(W) = \text{log}(a W+b)$.

== Decreasing, constant, and increasing absolute risk aversion ==
Absolute risk aversion is decreasing if $A'(W) < 0$ (equivalently T '(W) > 0), which occurs if and only if $\gamma$ is finite and less than 1; this is considered the empirically plausible case, since it implies that an investor will put more funds into risky assets the more funds are available to invest. Constant absolute risk aversion occurs as $\gamma$ goes to positive or negative infinity, and the particularly implausible case of increasing absolute risk aversion occurs if $\gamma$ is greater than one and finite.

== Decreasing, constant, and increasing relative risk aversion ==
Relative risk aversion is defined as R(W)= WA(W); it is increasing if $R'(W) > 0$, decreasing if $R'(W) < 0$, and constant if $R'(W) = 0$. Thus relative risk aversion is increasing if b > 0 (for $\gamma \ne 1$), constant if b = 0, and decreasing if b < 0 (for $- \infty < \gamma < 1$).

== Special cases ==
- Utility is linear (the risk neutral case) if $\gamma = 1$.
- Utility is quadratic (an implausible though very mathematically tractable case, with increasing absolute risk aversion) if $\gamma = 2$.
- The exponential utility function, which has constant absolute risk aversion, occurs if b = 1 and $\gamma$ goes to negative infinity.
- The power utility function occurs if $\gamma < 1$ and $a = 1 - \gamma$.

- The more special case of the isoelastic utility function, with constant relative risk aversion, occurs if, further, b = 0.

- The logarithmic utility function occurs for $a=1$ as $\gamma$ goes to 0.

- The more special case of constant relative risk aversion equal to one — U(W) = log(W) — occurs if, further, b = 0.

== Behavioral predictions resulting from HARA utility ==
=== Static portfolios ===
If all investors have HARA utility functions with the same exponent, then in the presence of a risk-free asset a two-fund monetary separation theorem results: every investor holds the available risky assets in the same proportions as do all other investors, and investors differ from each other in their portfolio behavior only with regard to the fraction of their portfolios held in the risk-free asset rather than in the collection of risky assets.

Moreover, if an investor has a HARA utility function and a risk-free asset is available, then the investor's demands for the risk-free asset and all risky assets are linear in initial wealth.

In the capital asset pricing model, there exists a representative investor utility function depending on the individual investors' utility functions and wealth levels, independent of the assets available, if and only if all investors have HARA utility functions with the same exponent. The representative utility function depends on the distribution of wealth, and one can describe market behavior as if there were a single investor with the representative utility function.

With a complete set of state-contingent securities, a sufficient condition for security prices in equilibrium to be independent of the distribution of initial wealth holdings is that all investors have HARA utility functions with identical exponent and identical rate of time preference between beginning-of-period and end-of-period consumption.

=== Dynamic portfolios in discrete time ===
In a discrete time dynamic portfolio optimization context, under HARA utility optimal portfolio choice involves partial myopia if there is a risk-free asset and there is serial independence of asset returns: to find the optimal current-period portfolio, one needs to know no future distributional information about the asset returns except the future risk-free returns.

With asset returns that are independently and identically distributed through time and with a risk-free asset, risky asset proportions are independent of the investor's remaining lifetime.

=== Dynamic portfolios in continuous time ===
With asset returns whose evolution is described by Brownian motion and which are independently and identically distributed through time, and with a risk-free asset, one can obtain an explicit solution for the demand for the unique optimal mutual fund, and that demand is linear in initial wealth.
