= Isoelastic utility =

Concept in economics

Isoelastic utility for different values of $\eta.$ When $\eta>1$ the curve approaches a horizontal asymptote as $c\to\infty$ and approaches $-\infty$ as $c\to 0$.

In economics, the isoelastic function for utility, also known as the isoelastic utility function, or power utility function, is used to express utility in terms of consumption or some other economic variable that a decision-maker is concerned with. The isoelastic utility function is a special case of hyperbolic absolute risk aversion and at the same time is the only class of utility functions with constant relative risk aversion, which is why it is also called the CRRA (constant relative risk aversion) utility function. In statistics, the same function is called the Box-Cox transformation.

It is

$$u(c) = \begin{cases}
\frac{c^{1-\eta} - 1}{1-\eta} & \eta \ge 0, \eta \neq 1 \\
\ln(c) & \eta = 1
\end{cases}$$

where $c$ is consumption, $u(c)$ the associated utility, and $\eta$ is a constant that is positive for risk averse agents. Since additive constant terms in objective functions do not affect optimal decisions, the –1 is sometimes omitted in the numerator (although it should be kept if one wishes to preserve mathematical consistency with the limiting case of $\ln(c)$; see Special cases below). Since the family contains both power functions and the logarithmic function, it is sometimes called power-log utility.

When the context involves risk, the utility function is viewed as a von Neumann–Morgenstern utility function, and the parameter $\eta$ is the degree of relative risk aversion.

The isoelastic utility function is a special case of the hyperbolic absolute risk aversion (HARA) utility functions, and is used in analyses that either include or do not include underlying risk.

== Empirical value ==
There is substantial debate in the economics and finance literature with respect to the true value of $\eta$. While extremely high values of $\eta$ (of up to 50 in some models) are needed to explain the behavior of asset prices, most experiments document behavior that is more consistent with values of $\eta$ only slightly greater than 1. For example, Groom and Maddison (2019) estimated the value of $\eta$ to be 1.5 in the United Kingdom, while Evans (2005) estimated its value to be around 1.4 in 20 OECD countries. The utility of income can also be estimated using subjective well-being surveys. Using six national and international such surveys, Layard et al. (2008) found values between 1.19 an 1.34 with a combined estimate of 1.26.

== Risk aversion features ==
This utility function has the feature of constant relative risk aversion. Mathematically this means that $-c \cdot u''(c)/u'(c)$ is a constant, specifically $\eta$. In theoretical models this often has the implication that decision-making is unaffected by scale. For instance, in the standard model of one risk-free asset and one risky asset, under constant relative risk aversion the fraction of wealth optimally placed in the risky asset is independent of the level of initial wealth.

== Special cases ==
- $\eta=0$: this corresponds to risk neutrality, because utility is linear in c.
- $\eta=1$: by virtue of l'Hôpital's rule, the limit of $u(c)$ is $\ln c$ as $\eta$ goes to 1:

$$\lim_{\eta\rightarrow1}\frac{c^{1-\eta}-1}{1-\eta}=\ln(c)$$

which justifies the convention of using the limiting value u(c) = ln c when $\eta=1$.

- $\eta$ → $\infty$: this is the case of infinite risk aversion.

== See also ==
- Isoelastic function
- Constant elasticity of substitution
- Exponential utility
- Risk aversion
