= Balanced-growth equilibrium =

In macroeconomics, the balanced-growth path of a dynamic model is a trajectory such that all variables grow at a constant rate. In the standard exogenous growth model, balanced growth is a basic assumption, while other variables like the capital stock, real GDP, and output per worker are growing. Developing economies may adopt a strategy of unbalanced growth to rectify previous investment decisions, as put forward by economist Albert O. Hirschman.

In microbiology, the state of balanced-growth means "every extensive property of the growing system increases by the same factor over a time interval". It is ideal for performing experiments because all bacteria are at about the same state (as opposed to stationary phase, for example, where some cells are alive and others are dead). Machines like chemostats can be used to culture bacteria and keep them in a state of balanced-growth for long-term experiments.

Balance Growth refers to a specific type of economic growth that is sustainable in the long term. Balance Growth is opposed to the boom and bust nature of economic cycles.

According to Alak Ghosh, " Planning with balanced growth indicates that all sectors of the economy will expand in same proportion, so that consumption, investment and income will grow at the same rates. It stresses that the balanced growth can occur when the growth rates of the consumption, investment and income are equal to each other".

According to W. A. Lewis," In development programmes, all sectors of economy should grow simultaneously so as to keep a proper balance between industry and agriculture and between production for home consumption and. Production for exports. The truth is that all sectors should be expanded simultaneously.

== See also ==
- Steady state economy
- Nurkse's Balanced Growth economic theory
