= Risk-seeking =

Willingness to take risks

In economics, finance, and psychology, risk-seeking (also called risk-loving or risk preference) refers to a behavioral tendency to prefer uncertain options with potentially higher rewards over safer alternatives with lower expected value. Risk-seeking individuals derive greater satisfaction or perceived utility from taking chances, even when the probable outcome may be less favorable. Within behavioral economics, risk-seeking is often contrasted with risk aversion and analyzed using expected utility theory and prospect theory. Research in psychology connects risk-seeking to particular personality traits, including impulsivity, sensation-seeking, and developmental factors. These behaviors tend to peak during adolescence.

== Theoretical background ==
Choice under uncertainty is when a person facing a choice is not certain of the possible outcomes or their probability of occurring. The standard way to model how people choose under uncertain conditions is by using expected utility. In order to calculate expected utility, a utility function 'u' is developed in order to translate money into Utility. Therefore, if a person has '$x$' money, their utility would be $u(x)$. This is explored further when investigating potential "prospects." A prospect, in this context, is a list of expected payoffs and their probabilities of occurring. A prospect is typically summarized using the following form: risk-seeking is often contrasted with risk aversion and analyzed using expected utility theory and prospect theory. According to these models, individuals’ risk preferences vary depending on how potential outcomes are framed as gains or losses, as well as the psychological weighting of probabilities.

$Prospect A = (p_1,x_1;p_2, x_2;...;p_n,x_n)$

The overall expected value of the prospect (A) is subsequently expressed as;

$V(A)=\sum_{i=1}^np_ix_i$

The expected utility, U(A), of the prospect is then determined using the below formula;

$U(A)=\sum_{i=1}^np_iu(x_i)$

== Utility function ==
The utility function is convex for a risk-lover and concave for a risk-averse person (and subsequently linear for a risk-neutral person). Subsequently, it can be understood that the utility function curves in this way depending on the individual's personal preference towards risk.

Below is an example of a convex utility function, with wealth, '$x$' along the x-axis and utility, '$u(x)$' along the y-axis. The below graph shows how greater payoffs result in larger utility values at an increasing rate. Showing that the person with this utility function is "risk-loving".

Convex utility function

Alternatively, below is an example of a concave utility function, with wealth, '$x$' along the x-axis and utility, '$u(x)$' along the y-axis. The below graph again display's an individual's utility function, however this time lower payoffs have a larger utility with respect to the original payoff (or "wealth") value. The utility values, although still increasing, do so as a decreasing rate. Showing that this person is "risk-averse".

Concave utility function

For prospect theory value functions, risk-seeking behavior can be observed in the negative domain $x<0$, where the functions are convex for $x<0$ but concave for $x > 0$.

== Psychological perspectives ==
Research in psychology has explored the relationship between personality traits, developmental factors, and risk-seeking behavior across the lifespan. Studies suggest that low levels of childhood conscientiousness and higher impulsivity are associated with greater risk-taking tendencies in adolescence and adulthood. Individuals who exhibit poor impulse control are more likely to engage in behaviors with higher potential for harm, including substance use and reckless driving, whereas those with high conscientiousness tend to demonstrate more cautious and future-oriented decision-making. In some adolescents, usage of cannabis products has been associated with reactive aggression and impulsivity. These may link to both genetic and environmental risks, such as childhood trauma.

Risk-seeking behavior often peaks during adolescence, a developmental stage marked by increased sensitivity to reward and social influence. Zuckerman’s sensation-seeking theory describes risk-taking as part of a broader personality dimension reflecting the pursuit of varied, novel, and intense experiences, even at the risk of physical or social harm. Especially in sports, achieving positive outcomes, such as personal development and improved performance, may be associated with a willingness to take appropriate psychological and emotional risks.

== Sensation seeking and psychometric paradigm ==
The psychometric paradigm explores what stable personality traits and risk behaviors have in common with an individualistic approach. Zuckerman's (1994) sensation seeking theory is important in assessing the causative factors of certain risk-seeking behaviors. Many risk-seeking behaviors justify humans need for sensation seeking. Behaviors like adventurous sports, drug use, promiscuous sex, entrepreneurship, gambling, and dangerous driving to name a few both represent sensation seeking , as well as risk seeking. Impulsivity has been linked to risk-seeking and can be described as the desire to indulge in situations with a potential reward, and little to no planning of the potential punishments of loss or reward. Impulsivity has also been linked to sensation seeking and in recent theories, they have been combined to form a higher-order trait called "impulsive sensation seeking."

== Neuropsychological paradigm ==
The neuropsychological paradigm looks at why people make the decisions they do, as well as the neuropsychological processes that contribute to the decisions people make. This view looks less at impulsivity, puts more emphasis on cognitive dynamics and assumes people take risks because they have assessed the future outcomes.

== Gender differences ==
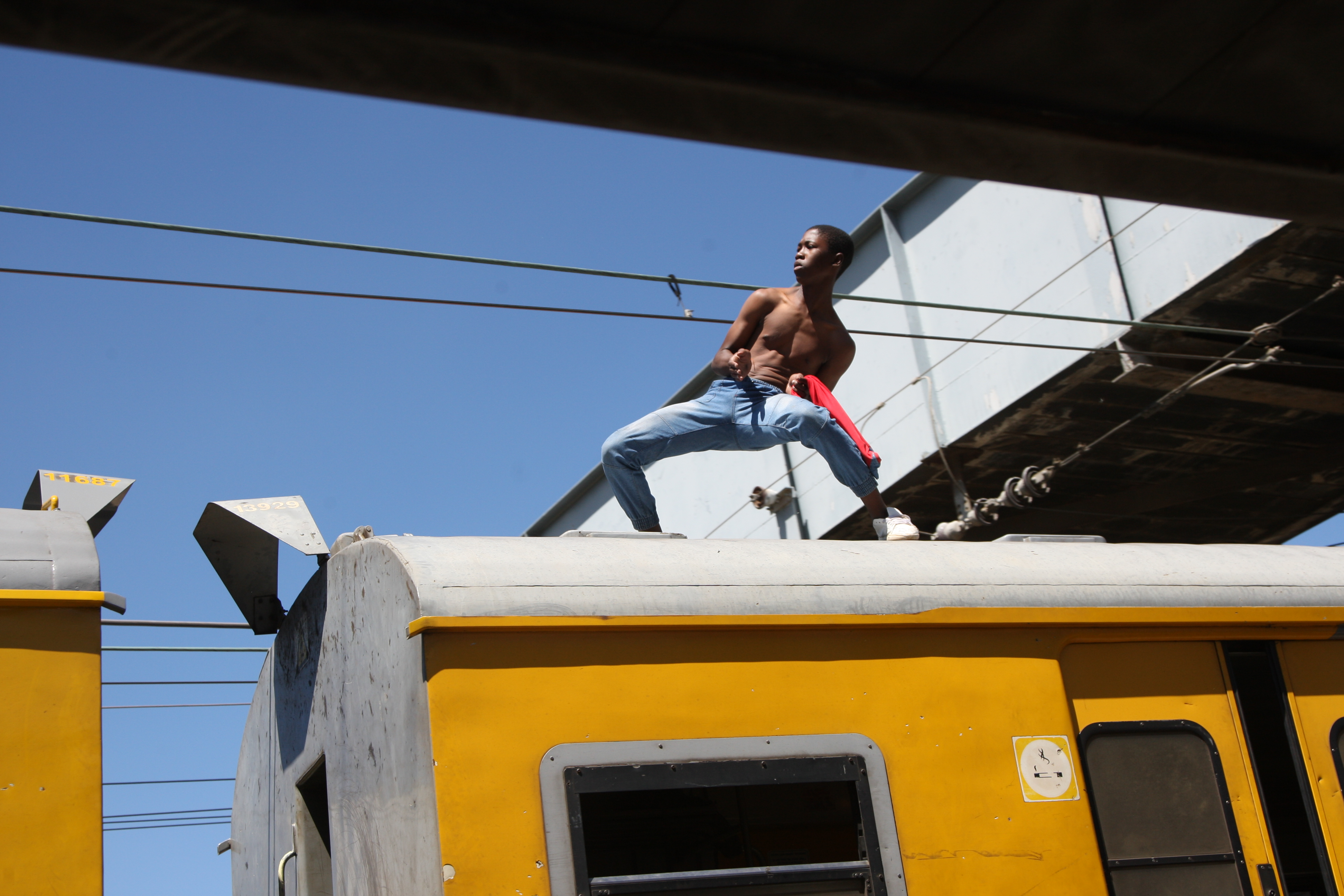
Risk-seeking youth in Soweto (South Africa)

Some studies have found that men typically engage in more risk-seeking behaviors than women. There are biological differences between men and women that may lead to the drive to seek risks. For example, women have significantly lower levels of testosterone, which plays a large role in risk-seeking. This hormone has behavioral effects on aggression, mood and sexual function, and these factors are connected with risk-seeking decision making. In their study, they also found that testosterone in excess leads to increased sexual enjoyment, and therefore more of an incentive to engage in risky unprotected sex.

== Adolescent risk seeking ==
A 2022 study using smartphone GPS tracking found that adolescents become increasingly exploratory with age (visiting a greater variety of new locations), and that higher exploration levels were associated with improved daily mood and larger social networks in both adolescents and young adults. The study also reported that greater exploration correlated with higher self-reported risk-taking only among teenagers (ages 13–17) and not in adults, suggesting that adolescent exploration may introduce youth to novel situations that facilitate risk-taking behavior.

== See also ==
- Expected utility theory
- Sensation seeking
- Behavioural economics
- Impulsivity
