= Risk neutral preferences =

Neither risk aversion nor risk seeking

In economics and finance, risk neutral preferences are preferences that are neither risk averse nor risk seeking. A risk neutral party's decisions are not affected by the degree of uncertainty in a set of outcomes, so a risk neutral party is indifferent between choices with equal expected payoffs even if one choice is riskier.

== Theory of the firm ==
In the context of the theory of the firm, a risk neutral firm facing risk about the market price of its product, and caring only about profit, would maximize the expected value of its profit (with respect to its choices of labor input usage, output produced, etc.). But a risk averse firm in the same environment would typically take a more cautious approach.

== Portfolio theory ==
In portfolio choice, a risk neutral investor who is able to choose any combination of an array of risky assets (various companies' stocks, various companies' bonds, etc.) would invest exclusively in the asset with the highest expected yield, ignoring its risk features relative to those of other assets. In contrast, a risk averse investor would diversify among a variety of assets, taking account of their risk features, even though doing so would lower the expected return on the overall portfolio. The risk neutral investor's portfolio would have a higher expected return, but also a greater variance of possible returns.

== The risk neutral utility function ==
Choice under uncertainty is often characterized as the maximization of expected utility. Utility is often assumed to be a function of profit or final portfolio wealth, with a positive first derivative. The utility function whose expected value is maximized is concave for a risk averse agent, convex for a risk lover, and linear for a risk neutral agent. Thus in the risk neutral case, expected utility of wealth is simply equal to the expectation of a linear function of wealth, and maximizing it is equivalent to maximizing expected wealth itself.

== See also ==
- Rational pricing § Risk neutral valuation
- Risk-neutral measure
