= Certainty effect =

Psychological effect

The certainty effect is the psychological effect resulting from the reduction of probability from certain to probable (Tversky & Kahneman 1986). It is an idea introduced in prospect theory.

Normally a reduction in the probability of winning a reward (e.g., a reduction from 80% to 20% in the chance of winning a reward) creates a psychological effect such as displeasure to individuals, which leads to the perception of loss from the original probability thus favoring a risk-averse decision. However, the same reduction results in a larger psychological effect when it is done from certainty than from uncertainty.

== Example ==
Tversky & Kahneman (1986) illustrated the certainty effect by the following examples.

First, consider this example:

Which of the following options do you prefer?

- A. a sure gain of $30
- B. 80% chance to win $45 and 20% chance to win nothing

In this case, 78% of participants chose option A while only 22% chose option B. This demonstrates the typical risk-aversion phenomenon in prospect theory and framing effect because the expected value of option B ($45x0.8=$36) exceeds that of A by 20%.

Now, consider this problem:

Which of the following options do you prefer?

- C. 25% chance to win $30 and 75% chance to win nothing
- D. 20% chance to win $45 and 80% chance to win nothing

In this case, 42% of participants chose option C while 58% chose option D.

As before, the expected value of the first option ($30x0.25=$7.50) was 20% lower than that of option D ($45x0.2=9) however, when neither option was certain, risk-taking increased.

== See also ==
- Pseudocertainty effect
- Framing effect
- Prospect theory
- Allais paradox

== Bibliography ==
=== Papers ===
- Tversky, Amos; Kahneman, Daniel (1981). "The Framing of decisions and the psychology of choice" (PDF). Science. 211 (4481): 453–458. Bibcode:1981Sci...211..453T. doi:10.1126/science.7455683. PMID 7455683. S2CID 5643902.
- Tversky, Amos; Kahneman, Daniel (1986). "Rational Choice and the Framing of Decisions" (PDF). The Journal of Business. 59 (S4): S251. doi:10.1086/296365. Archived from the original (PDF) on 2019-11-26.

=== General references ===
- Baron, Jonathan (2006). "Chapter 11: Prospect theory". Thinking and Deciding (4th ed.). Cambridge University Press. p. 262. ISBN 978-0-521-68043-1.
