= Framing error =

Framing error can refer to the following:

- General form of a framing error is the result of starting to read a sequence of data at the wrong point.
- In serial communications, a framing error is the result of reading a data frame – a string of symbols which are grouped in blocks – at the wrong starting point. The symbols are bits and the blocks are bytes, ten bits in asynchronous transmission and eight in synchronous. A framing error in an asynchronous stream usually recovers quickly, but a framing error in a synchronous stream produces gibberish at the end of the packet. Framing errors can be detected with parity bits.
- In genetics, a framing error (also called a frameshift or a frameshift mutation) is a mutation that inserts or deletes a single nucleotide from a DNA sequence. Due to the triplet nature of gene expression, the insertion/deletion can disrupt the grouping of the codons, resulting in a completely different translation from the original.
- In psychology, the framing effect (psychology) is an example of cognitive bias in which people react to a particular choice in different ways depending on how it is presented. Cognitive errors as a result of this bias are commonly called framing errors.
