= Frame analysis =

Multi-disciplinary social science research method

Frame analysis (also called framing analysis) is a multi-disciplinary social science research method used to analyze how people understand situations and activities. Frame analysis looks at images, stereotypes, metaphors, actors, messages, and more. It examines how important these factors are and how and why they are chosen. The concept is generally attributed to the work of Erving Goffman and his 1974 book Frame analysis: An essay on the organization of experience and has been developed in social movement theory, policy studies and elsewhere.

Framing theory and frame analysis is a broad theoretical approach that has been used in communication studies, news (Johnson-Cartee, 1995), politics, and social movements among other applications. "Framing is the process by which a communication source, such as a news organization, defines and constructs a political issue or public controversy" (Nelson, Oxley, & Clawson, 1997, p. 221). It is related to the concept of agenda-setting. Framing influences how people interpret or process information. This can set an agenda. However, frame analysis goes beyond agenda-setting by examining the issues rather than the topics.

Frame analysis is usually done in regard to news media. However, framing is inevitable, as everyone does it. It can speed up the process of interpretation as well as writing and presenting the news. People just may not realize they are using frames. When people are aware that they are using framing, there are several techniques that can be used. These may include: metaphor, stories, tradition, slogan, jargon, catchphrase, artifact, contrast or spin.

== As rhetorical criticism ==
Frame analysis had been proposed as a type of rhetorical analysis for political actors in the 1980s. Political communication researcher Jim A. Kuypers first published his work advancing framing analysis as a rhetorical perspective in 1997. His approach begins inductively by looking for themes that persist across time in a text (for Kuypers, primarily news narratives on an issue or event), and then determining how those themes are framed. Kuypers' work begins with the assumption that frames are powerful rhetorical entities that "induce us to filter our perceptions of the world in particular ways, essentially making some aspects of our multi-dimensional reality more noticeable than other aspects. They operate by making some information more salient than other information. ..." In "Framing Analysis From a Rhetorical Perspective" Kuypers details the differences between framing analysis as rhetorical criticism and as a social scientific endeavor, in particular arguing that framing criticism offers insights unavailable to social scientists.

In his 2009 work, Rhetorical Criticism: Perspectives in Action Kuypers offers a detailed template for doing framing analysis from a rhetorical perspective. According to Kuypers, "Framing is a process whereby communicators, consciously or unconsciously, act to construct a point of view that encourages the facts of a given situation to be interpreted by others in a particular manner. Frames operate in four key ways: they define problems, diagnose causes, make moral judgments, and suggest remedies. Frames are often found within a narrative account of an issue or event, and are generally the central organizing idea." Kuypers' work is based on the premise that framing is a rhetorical process and as such it is best examined from a rhetorical point of view.

== Distinctions within primary frameworks ==
In his book, Goffman said that people use their primary framework to examine their world. There are also distinctions within primary frameworks. There are natural and social frameworks. Natural frameworks don't apply social forces to situations. They just exist naturally. However, social frameworks do apply social forces to situations. The two are connected because social frameworks stem from natural frameworks.

== For social movements ==
Framing has been utilized to explain the process of social movements (Snow & Benford, 1988). Movements are carriers of beliefs and ideologies. In addition, they are part of the process of constructing meaning for participants and opposers (Snow & Benford, 1988). Mass movements are said to be successful when the frames projected align with the frames of participants to produce resonance between the two parties. This is a process known as frame alignment.

Snow and Benford (1988) say that frame alignment is an important element in social mobilization or movement. They argue that when individual frames become linked in congruency and complementariness, that "frame alignment" occurs (p. 198; Snow et al. 1986, p. 464), producing "frame resonance", which is key to the process of a group transitioning from one frame to another (although not all framing efforts are successful).

== For political thought ==
Frame analysis for political thought has been dominated by two popular cognitive scientists: George Lakoff, nurturant parent governance; and Frank Luntz, strict father governance.

== Content analysis in framing ==
The deductive frame analysis pre-defines frames and then looks for them in the news to see which stories fit into the definitions. The inductive frame analysis requires that a story is analyzed first. The researcher looks for possible frames that have been loosely defined.

== Common frames in the news ==
- Conflict: conflicts between individual people, groups, institutions, etc.
- Economic consequences: looks at the economic consequences of a situation in the news and how it may affect people, groups, institutions, etc. economically
- Human interest: adds emotion or a human side to an issue, event, etc.
- Morality: applies religious or moral beliefs to a situation
- Responsibility: makes someone (individual, group, institution, etc.) responsible for a situation

Other examples of frames may include: health severity, thematic and episodic, medical, uncertainty, alarmist. What frames are used depends on the event at hand.

== Automated frame analysis ==
Since frame analyses are conducted manually, they require significant effort and time. Recently, some researchers have proposed to automate parts of frame analysis. For example, one approach aims to find instances of biased news coverage in news articles. The automated approach imitates frame analysis by using natural language processing and media bias models.

== See also ==
- Alternative facts – Expression associated with political misinformation established in 2017
- Argumentation theory – Academic field of logic and rhetoric
- Code word (figure of speech) – Word or phrase with a special meaning
- Concept-driven strategy
- Communication theory – Proposed description of communication phenomena
- Discourse analysis – Analysis of social and lingual policy, or historiographical discourse phenomena
- Figure of speech – Purposeful use of language
- Framing – Effect of how information is presented on perception
- Language and thought – Study of how language influences thought
- Idea networking
- Meme – Cultural idea that spreads through imitation
- Metaphorical framing – Type of framing
- Narrative inquiry – Discipline within qualitative research
- Newspeak – Fictional language in the novel "Nineteen Eighty-Four"
- Personal construct theory – Theory of personality and cognition
- Political frame – Effect of how information is presented on perception
- Loaded language, also known as Power word – Rhetoric used to influence an audience
- Rhetorical device – Purposeful use of language
- Semantics – Study of meaning in language
- Spin – Form of propaganda in public relations and politics
- Stovepiping – Presenting information without proper context
- Thought Reform (book) – American psychiatrist and author (1926–2025)
- Trope – Type of narrative convention
- Unspeak (book) – British writer
