= Framing (social sciences) =

Effect of how information is presented on perception

In the social sciences, framing is a set of concepts and theoretical perspectives on how individuals, groups, and societies organize, perceive, and communicate about reality. Framing can manifest in thought or interpersonal communication. Frames in thought consist of the mental representations, interpretations, and simplifications of reality. Frames in communication consist of the communication of frames between different actors. Framing is a key component of sociology, the study of social interaction among humans. Framing is an integral part of conveying and processing data daily. Successful framing techniques can be used to reduce the ambiguity of intangible topics by contextualizing the information in such a way that recipients can connect to what they already know.

In social theory, framing is a schema of interpretation, a collection of anecdotes and stereotypes, that individuals rely on to understand and respond to events. In other words, people build a series of mental "filters" through biological and cultural influences. They then use these filters to make sense of the world. The choices they then make are influenced by their creation of a frame. Framing involves social construction of a social phenomenon – by mass media sources, political or social movements, political leaders, or other actors and organizations. Participation in a language community necessarily influences an individual's perception of the meanings attributed to words or phrases. Politically, the language communities of advertising, religion, and mass media are highly contested, whereas framing in less-sharply defended language communities might evolve imperceptibly and organically over cultural time frames, with fewer overt modes of disputation.

One can view framing in communication as positive or negative – depending on the audience and what kind of information is being presented. The framing may be in the form of equivalence frames, where two or more logically equivalent alternatives are portrayed in different ways (see framing effect) or emphasis frames, which simplify reality by focusing on a subset of relevant aspects of a situation or issue. In the case of "equivalence frames", the information being presented is based on the same facts, but the "frame" in which it is presented changes, thus creating a reference-dependent perception.

The effects of framing can be seen in journalism: the frame surrounding the issue can change the reader's perception without having to alter the actual facts as the same information is used as a base. This is done through the media's choice of certain words and images to cover a story (e.g. using the word fetus vs. the word baby). In the context of politics or mass-media communication, a frame defines the packaging of an element of rhetoric in such a way as to encourage certain interpretations and to discourage others. For political purposes, framing often presents facts in such a way that implicates a problem that requires a solution. Members of political parties attempt to frame issues in a way that makes a solution favoring their own political leaning appear as the most appropriate course of action for the situation at hand.

== Examples ==
When we want to explain an event, our understanding is often based on our interpretation (frame). If someone rapidly closes and opens an eye, we react differently based on if we interpret this as a "physical frame" (they blinked) or a "social frame" (they winked). The blink may be due to a speck of dust (resulting in an involuntary and not particularly meaningful reaction). The wink may imply a voluntary and meaningful action (to convey humor to an accomplice, for example).

Observers will read events seen as purely physical or within a frame of "nature" differently from those seen as occurring with social frames. But we do not look at an event and then "apply" a frame to it. Rather, individuals constantly project into the world around them the interpretive frames that allow them to make sense of it; we only shift frames (or realize that we have habitually applied a frame) when incongruity calls for a frame-shift. In other words, we only become aware of the frames that we always already use when something forces us to replace one frame with another.

Though some consider framing to be synonymous with agenda setting, other scholars state that there is a distinction. According to an article written by Donald H. Weaver, framing selects certain aspects of an issue and makes them more prominent in order to elicit certain interpretations and evaluations of the issue, whereas agenda setting introduces the issue topic to increase its salience and accessibility.

== In sociology ==
Framing theory provides a broad theoretical approach that analysts have used in communication studies, news (Johnson-Cartee, 1995), politics, and social movements (among other applications). According to Bert Klandermans, the "social construction of collective action frames" involves "public discourse, that is, the interface of media discourse and interpersonal interaction; persuasive communication during mobilization campaigns by movement organizations, their opponents and countermovement organizations; and consciousness raising during episodes of collective action".

=== History ===
Word-selection has been a component of rhetoric. Most commentators attribute the concept of framing to the work of Erving Goffman on frame analysis and point to his 1974 book, Frame analysis: An essay on the organization of experience. On p. 7 of Frame Analysis, Goffman credits Gregory Bateson with introducing him to frames, writing "it is in Bateson's paper ("A Theory of Play and Fantasy") that the term 'frame' was proposed in roughly the sense in which I want to employ it." Goffman used the idea of frames to label "schemata of interpretation" that allow individuals or groups "to locate, perceive, identify, and label" events and occurrences, thus rendering meaning, organizing experiences, and guiding actions. Goffman's framing concept evolved out of his 1959 work, The Presentation of Self in Everyday Life, a commentary on the management of impressions. These works arguably depend on Kenneth Boulding's concept of image.

=== Social movement theory ===
Sociologists have utilized framing to explain the process of social movements. Movements act as carriers of beliefs and ideologies (compare memes). In addition, they operate as part of the process of constructing meaning for participants and opposers. Sociologists deem the mobilization of mass-movements "successful" when the frames projected align with the frames of participants to produce resonance between the two parties. Ultimately, effective framing can shape movement outcomes by influencing public perception, strengthening collective identity, and opening political opportunities.

Framing is not a static process but an ongoing negotiation shaped by discursive, strategic, and contested processes. Movements create narratives through discussion and storytelling, strategically align their messages with broader cultural themes, and continuously adapt to opposition. Strategies such as bridging (connecting with related movements), amplification (emphasizing key themes), extension (broadening issues to attract new supporters), and transformation (redefining societal meanings) all play a role in shaping movement discourse. However, movements must also contend with counterframing from opponents, internal frame disputes, and the evolving relationship between frames and real-world events.

The success of a movement's framing efforts is influenced by external factors such as political opportunities, cultural resonance, and audience reception. Political conditions can facilitate or constrain framing efforts, while cultural narratives determine how well movement messages resonate with the public. Additionally, movements often tailor their frames to appeal to different audiences, from policymakers and the media to grassroots activists and potential recruits.

One example of framing being used by organizations is to change the way that their image looks towards the public. On the issue of abortion, one side proclaims they are Pro-Life, and the other, Pro-Choice. Both of these titles are inherently a good thing. A person who does not have a stance on this issue would see both of these titles reflecting values that are important to everyone. No person will be against Life or Choice, which is why these titles were strategically chosen by the organizations. However, framing can be used to try and paint the opposition as the "bad guys". One example of this is how protest signs are used at Pro-Choice protests, one of the most popular things to write on a sign is "Abortion Kills". Everyone can agree that killing a person is bad, which is why they use this wording to oppose Pro-Choice. When it is framed in such a way, the way you think about the issue changes. The countermovement against pro-choice uses rhetoric and language to sway the public opinion.

==== Frame alignment ====
Snow and Benford (1988) regard frame-alignment as an important element in social mobilization or movement. They argue that when individual frames become linked in congruency and complementariness, "frame alignment" occurs, producing "frame resonance", a catalyst in the process of a group making the transition from one frame to another (although not all framing efforts prove successful). The conditions that affect or constrain framing efforts include the following:

- "The robustness, completeness, and thoroughness of the framing effort". Snow and Benford (1988) identify three core framing-tasks, and state that the degree to which framers attend to these tasks will determine participant mobilization. They characterize the three tasks as the following:
  1. diagnostic framing for the identification of a problem and assignment of blame
  2. prognostic framing to suggest solutions, strategies, and tactics to a problem
  3. motivational framing that serves as a call to arms or rationale for action
- The relationship between the proposed frame and the larger belief-system; centrality: the frame cannot be of low hierarchical significance and salience within the larger belief system. Its range and interrelatedness, if the framer links the frame to only one core belief or value that, in itself, has a limited range within the larger belief system, the frame has a high degree of being discounted.
- Relevance of the frame to the realities of the participants; a frame must seem relevant to participants and must also inform them. Empirical credibility or testability can constrain relevancy: it relates to participant experience, and has narrative fidelity, meaning that it fits in with existing cultural myths and narrations.
- Cycles of protest (Tarrow 1983a; 1983b); the point at which the frame emerges on the timeline of the current era and existing preoccupations with social change. Previous frames may affect efforts to impose a new frame.

Snow and Benford (1988) propose that once someone has constructed proper frames as described above, large-scale changes in society such as those necessary for social movement can be achieved through frame alignment. Frame alignment comes in four forms: frame bridging, frame amplification, frame extension and frame transformation.

1. Frame bridging involves the "linkage of two or more ideologically congruent but structurally unconnected frames regarding a particular issue or problem" (Snow et al., 1986, p. 467). It involves the linkage of a movement to "unmobilized [sic] sentiment pools or public opinion preference clusters" (p. 467) of people who share similar views or grievances but who lack an organizational base.
2. Frame amplification refers to "the clarification and invigoration of an interpretive frame that bears on a particular issue, problem, or set of events" (Snow et al., 1986, p. 469). This interpretive frame usually involves the invigorating of values or beliefs.
3. Frame extensions represent a movement's effort to incorporate participants by extending the boundaries of the proposed frame to include or encompass the views, interests, or sentiments of targeted groups (Snow et al., 1986, p. 472).
4. Frame transformation becomes necessary when the proposed frames "may not resonate with, and on occasion may even appear antithetical to, conventional lifestyles or rituals and extant interpretive frames" (Snow et al., 1986, p. 473).

When this happens, the securing of participants and support requires new values, new meanings and understandings. Goffman (1974, pp. 43–44) calls this "keying", where "activities, events, and biographies that are already meaningful from the standpoint of some primary framework, in terms of another framework" (Snow et al., 1986, p. 474) such that they are seen differently. Two types of frame transformation exist:

1. Domain-specific transformations, such as the attempt to alter the status of groups of people, and
2. Global interpretive frame-transformation, where the scope of change seems quite radical—as in a change of world-views, total conversions of thought, or uprooting of everything familiar (for example: moving from communism to market capitalism, or vice versa; religious conversion, etc.

== In communication studies ==
=== News framing ===
In communication studies, framing defines how news media coverage shapes mass opinion. Richard E. Vatz's discourse on the creation of rhetorical meaning relates directly to framing, although he references it little. To be specific, framing effects refer to behavioral or attitudinal strategies and/or outcomes that are due to how a given piece of information is being framed in public discourse. Today, many volumes of the major communication journals contain papers on media frames and framing effects. Approaches used in such papers can be broadly classified into two groups: studies of framing as the dependent variable and studies of framing as the independent variable. The former usually deals with frame building (i.e. how frames create societal discourse about an issue and how different frames are adopted by journalists) and latter concerns frame setting (i.e. how media framing influences an audience).

==== Frame building ====
Frame-building research has typically recognized at least three main sets of influences that may impact the way journalists frame a certain issue:

- Systemic (e.g., characteristics of the media or political system in the specific setting of study).
- Organizational (e.g., features of the media organization such as political orientation, professional routines, relationships with government and elites, etc.).
- Temporal-contextual (e.g., time elapsed after the triggering event).

Erving Goffman emphasized the role of cultural context as a shaper of frames when he posited that the meaning of a frame has implicit cultural roots. This context dependency of media frames has been described as 'cultural resonance' or 'narrative fidelity'. As an example, most people might not notice the frame in stories about the separation of church and state, because the media generally does not frame their stories from a religious point of view. Frame building is a process that influences the creation or changes of frames applied by journalists. The term frame building, borrowed from agenda-setting research, seems to capture these processes best.

==== Frame setting ====
When people are exposed to a novel news frame, they will accept the constructs made applicable to an issue, but they are significantly more likely to do so when they have an existing mindset for those settings. This is called the applicability effect. That is, when new frames invite people to apply their existing schema to an issue, the implication of that application depends, in part, on what is in that schema. Therefore, generally, the more the audiences know about issues, the more effective are frames. For example, the more an audience knows about the deceitful practices of the tobacco industry, the more effective is the frame of the tobacco industry, rather than individuals who smoke, being responsible for the health impacts of smoking.

There are a number of levels and types of framing effects that have been examined. For example, scholars have focused on attitudinal and behavioral changes, the degrees of perceived importance of the issue, voting decisions, and opinion formations. Others are interested in psychological processes other than applicability. For instance, Iyengar suggested that news about social problems can influence attributions of causal and treatment responsibility, an effect observed in both cognitive responses and evaluations of political leaders, or other scholars looked at the framing effects on receivers' evaluative processing style and the complexity of audience members' thoughts about issues. Frame setting studies also address how frames can affect how someone thinks about an issue (cognitive) or feels about an issue (affective).

=== Mass communication research ===
News media frame all news items by emphasizing specific values, facts, and other considerations, and endowing them with greater apparent applicability for making related judgments. News media promotes particular definitions, interpretations, evaluations and recommendations.

==== Foundations in communication research ====
Anthropologist Gregory Bateson first defined the concept of framing as "a spatial and temporal bounding of a set of interactive messages" (A Theory of Play and Fantasy, 1954, reproduced in his 1972 book Steps to an Ecology of Mind).

===== Sociological roots of media framing research =====
Media framing research has both sociological and psychological roots. Sociological framing focuses on "the words, images, phrases, and presentation styles" that communicators use when relaying information to recipients. Research on frames in sociologically driven media research generally examines the influence of "social norms and values, organizational pressures and constraints, pressures of interest groups, journalistic routines, and ideological or political orientations of journalists" on the existence of frames in media content.

Todd Gitlin, in his analysis of how the news media trivialized the student New Left movement during the 1960s, was among the first to examine media frames from a sociological perspective. Frames, Gitlin wrote, are "persistent patterns of cognition, interpretations, and presentation, of selection [and] emphasis ... [that are] largely unspoken and unacknowledged ... [and] organize the world for both journalists [and] for those of us who read their reports".

===== Psychological roots of media framing research =====
Research on frames in psychologically driven media research generally examines the effects of media frames on those who receive them. For example, Iyengar explored the impact of episodic and thematic news frames on viewers' attributions of responsibility for political issues including crime, terrorism, poverty, unemployment, and racial inequality. According to Iyengar, an episodic news frame "takes the form of a case study or event-oriented report and depicts public issues in terms of concrete instances", in other words, focusing on a specific place in a specific time. Thematic news frame "places public issues in some more general abstract context ... directed at general outcomes or conditions", for example exploring commonality that happens in several places and times. Iyengar found that the majority of television news coverage of poverty, for example, was episodic. In fact, in a content analysis of six years of television news, Iyengar found that the typical news viewer would have been twice as likely to encounter episodic rather than thematic television news about poverty.

Further, experimental results indicate participants who watched episodic news coverage of poverty were more than twice as likely as those who watched thematic news coverage of poverty to attribute responsibility of poverty to the poor themselves rather than society. Given the predominance of episodic framing of poverty, Iyengar argues that television news shifts responsibility of poverty from government and society to the poor themselves. For example, the news media could use the "laziness and dysfunction" frame, which insinuates the poor would rather stay at home than go to work. After examining content analysis and experimental data on poverty and other political issues, Iyengar concludes that episodic news frames divert citizens' attributions of political responsibility away from society and political elites, making them less likely to support government efforts to address those issue and obscuring the connections between those issues and their elected officials' actions or lack thereof.

===== Visual framing =====
Visual framing refers to the process of using images to portray certain parts of reality. Visuals can be used to manifest meaning alongside textual framing. Text and visuals function best simultaneously. Advancement in print and screen-based technologies has resulted in merging of the two modes in information dissemination. Since each mode has its limitations, they are best used together and are interlinked in forming meaning.

Images are more preferable than text since they are less intrusive than words and require less cognitive load. From a psychological perspective, images activate nerve cells in the eyes in order to send information to the brain. Images can also generate a stronger emotional appeal and have high attraction value. Within the framing context, images can obscure issues and facts in an effort to frame information. Visuals consist of rhetorical tools such as metaphors, depictions, and symbols to portray the context of an event or scene graphically in an attempt to help us better understand the world around us. Images can have a one-to-one correspondence between what is captured on camera and its representation in the real world.

Along with increasing understanding, visuals can also elevate retention rates, making information easier to remember and recall. Due to the comparable nature of images, grammar rules do not apply. According to researchers, framing is reflected within a four-tiered model, which identifies and analyzes visual frames as follows: visuals as denotative systems, visuals as stylistic-semiotic systems, visuals as connotative systems, and visuals as ideological representations. Researchers caution against relying only on images to understand information. Since they hold more power than text and are more relatable to reality, we may overlook potential manipulations and staging and mistake this as evidence.

Images can be representative of ideologies by ascertaining underlying principles that constitute our basic attributes by combining symbols and stylistic features of an image into a process of coherent interpretation. One study indicates visual framing is prominent in news coverage, especially in relation to politics. Emotionally charged images are seen as a prominent tool for framing political messages. Visual framing can be effective by putting emphasis on a specific aspect of an issue, a tactic commonly used in portrayals of war and conflict news known as empathy framing. Visual framing that has emotional appeal can be considered more salient. This type of framing can be applied to other contexts, including athletics in relation to athletic disability. Visual framing in this context can reinterpret the perspective on athletic and physical incompetence, a formerly established media stereotype.

==== Clarifying and distinguishing a "fractured paradigm" ====
Perhaps because of their use across the social sciences, frames have been defined and used in many disparate ways. Entman called framing "a scattered conceptualization" and "a fractured paradigm" that "is often defined casually, with much left to an assumed tacit understanding of the reader". In an effort to provide more conceptual clarity, Entman suggested that frames "select some aspects of a perceived reality and make them more salient in a communicating text, in such a way as to promote a particular problem definition, causal interpretation, moral evaluation, and/or treatment recommendation for the item described". Entman's conceptualization of framing, which suggests frames work by elevating particular pieces of information in salience, is in line with much early research on the psychological underpinnings of framing effects (see also Iyengar, who argues that accessibility is the primary psychological explanation for the existence of framing effects). Wyer and Srull explain the construct of accessibility thus:

1. People store related pieces of information in "referent bins" in their long-term memory.
2. People organize "referent bins" such that more frequently and recently used pieces of information are stored at the top of the bins and are therefore more accessible.
3. Because people tend to retrieve only a small portion of information from long-term memory when making judgments, they tend to retrieve the most accessible pieces of information to use for making those judgments.

The argument supporting accessibility as the psychological process underlying framing can therefore be summarized thus: Because people rely heavily on news media for public affairs information, the most accessible information about public affairs often comes from the public affairs news they consume. This argument has also been cited as support in the debate over whether framing should be subsumed by agenda-setting theory as part of the second level of agenda setting. McCombs and other agenda-setting scholars generally agree that framing should be incorporated, along with priming, under the umbrella of agenda setting as a complex model of media effects that links media production, content, and audience effects. Indeed, McCombs, Llamas, Lopez-Escobar, and Rey justified their attempt to combine framing and agenda-setting research on the assumption of parsimony.

Scheufele, however, argues that, unlike agenda setting and priming, framing does not rely primarily on accessibility, making it inappropriate to combine framing with agenda setting and priming for the sake of parsimony. Empirical evidence seems to vindicate Scheufele's claim. For example, Nelson, Clawson, and Oxley empirically demonstrated that applicability, rather than their salience, is key. Measuring accessibility in terms of response latency of respondent answers, where more accessible information results in faster response times, Nelson, Clawson, and Oxley demonstrated that accessibility accounted for only a minor proportion of the variance in framing effects while applicability accounted for the major proportion of variance. Therefore, according to Nelson and colleagues, "frames influence opinions by stressing specific values, facts, and other considerations, endowing them with greater apparent relevance to the issue than they might appear to have under an alternative frame."

In other words, while early research suggested that by highlighting particular aspects of issues, frames make certain considerations more accessible and therefore more likely to be used in the judgment process, more recent research suggests that frames work by making particular considerations more applicable and therefore more relevant to the judgment process.

==== Equivalency versus emphasis: two types of frames in media research ====
Chong and Druckman suggest framing research has mainly focused on two types of frames: equivalency and emphasis frames. Equivalency frames offer "different, but logically equivalent phrases", which cause individuals to alter their preferences. Equivalency frames are often worded in terms of "gains" versus "losses". For example, Kahneman and Tversky asked participants to choose between two "gain-framed" policy responses to a hypothetical disease outbreak expected to kill 600 people. Response A would save 200 people while Response B had a one-third probability of saving everyone, but a two-thirds probability of saving no one. Participants overwhelmingly chose Response A, which they perceived as the less risky option. Kahneman and Tversky asked other participants to choose between two equivalent "loss-framed" policy responses to the same disease outbreak. In this condition, Response A would kill 400 people while Response B had a one-third probability of killing no one but a two-thirds probability of killing everyone. Although these options are mathematically identical to those given in the "gain-framed" condition, participants overwhelmingly chose Response B, the risky option. Kahneman and Tversky, then, demonstrated that when phrased in terms of potential gains, people tend to choose what they perceive as the less risky option (i.e., the sure gain). Conversely, when faced with a potential loss, people tend to choose the riskier option.

Unlike equivalency frames, emphasis frames offer "qualitatively different yet potentially relevant considerations" which individuals use to make judgments. Emphasis framing is distinct from agenda-setting. Emphasis framing represents the changes in the structure of communication to evoke a particular cognitive schema. Agenda setting relies upon the frequency or prominence of a message's issues to tell people what to think about. Emphasis framing refers to the influence of the structure of the message and agenda setting refers to the influence of the prominence of the content. For example, Nelson, Clawson, and Oxley exposed participants to a news story that presented the Ku Klux Klan's plan to hold a rally. Participants in one condition read a news story that framed the issue in terms of public safety concerns while participants in the other condition read a news story that framed the issue in terms of free speech considerations. Participants exposed to the public safety condition considered public safety applicable for deciding whether the Klan should be allowed to hold a rally and, as expected, expressed lower tolerance of the Klan's right to hold a rally. Participants exposed to the free speech condition considered free speech applicable for deciding whether the Klan should be allowed to hold a rally and, as expected, expressed greater tolerance of the Klan's right to hold a rally.

== In finance ==
Preference reversals and other associated phenomena are of wider relevance within behavioural economics, as they contradict the predictions of rational choice, the basis of traditional economics. Framing biases affecting investing, lending, borrowing decisions make one of the themes of behavioral finance.

== In psychology and economics ==
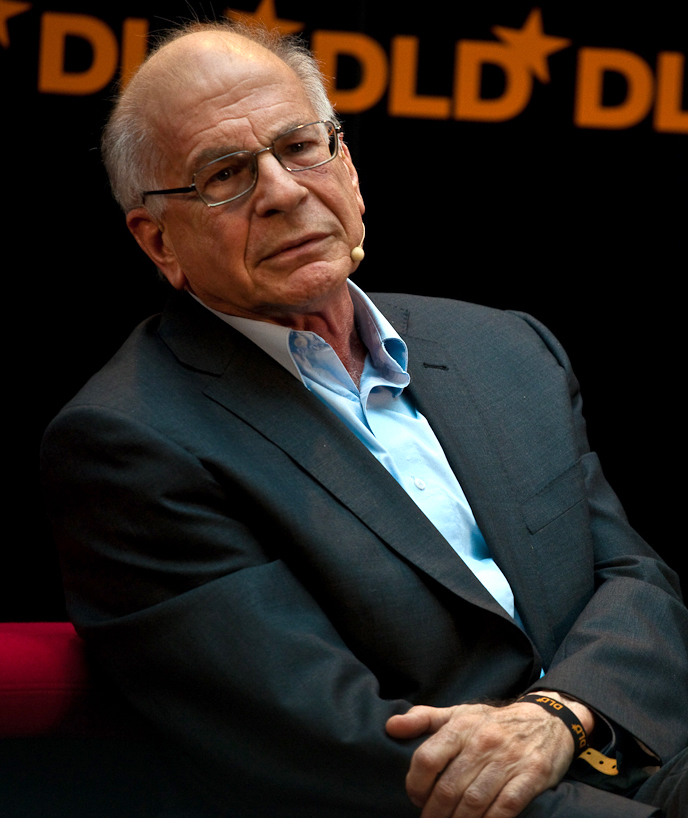
Daniel Kahneman

Amos Tversky and Daniel Kahneman have shown that framing can affect the outcome of choice problems (i.e. the choices one makes), so much so that some of the classic axioms of rational choice are not true. This led to the development of prospect theory. The context or framing of problems adopted by decision-makers results in part from extrinsic manipulation of the decision-options offered, as well as from forces intrinsic to decision-makers, e.g., their norms, habits, and unique temperament.

=== Experimental demonstration ===
Tversky and Kahneman (1981) demonstrated systematic bias when the same problem is presented in different ways, for example in the Asian disease problem. Participants were asked to "imagine that the U.S. is preparing for the outbreak of an unusual Asian disease, which is expected to kill 600 people. Two alternative programs to combat the disease have been proposed. Assume the exact scientific estimate of the consequences of the programs are as follows."

The first group of participants was presented with a choice between programs: In a group of 600 people,

- Program A: "200 people will be saved"
- Program B: "there is a 1/3 probability that 600 people will be saved, and a 2/3 probability that no people will be saved"

72 percent of participants preferred program A (the remainder, 28%, opting for program B).

The second group of participants was presented with the choice between the following: In a group of 600 people,

- Program C: "400 people will die"
- Program D: "there is a 1/3 probability that nobody will die, and a 2/3 probability that 600 people will die"

In this decision frame, 78% preferred program D, with the remaining 22% opting for program C.

Programs A and C are identical, as are programs B and D. The change in the decision frame between the two groups of participants produced a preference reversal: when the programs were presented in terms of lives saved, the participants preferred the secure program, A (= C). When the programs were presented in terms of expected deaths, participants chose the gamble D (= B).

=== Absolute and relative influences ===
Framing effects arise because one can often frame a decision using multiple scenarios, in which one may express benefits either as a relative risk reduction (RRR), or as absolute risk reduction (ARR). Extrinsic control over the cognitive distinctions (between risk tolerance and reward anticipation) adopted by decision makers can occur through altering the presentation of relative risks and absolute benefits.

People generally prefer the absolute certainty inherent in a positive framing-effect, which offers an assurance of gains. When decision-options appear framed as a likely gain, risk-averse choices predominate. A shift toward risk-seeking behavior occurs when a decision-maker frames decisions in negative terms, or adopts a negative framing effect. In medical decision making, framing bias is best avoided by using absolute measures of efficacy.

=== Frame-manipulation research ===
Researchers have found that framing decision-problems in a positive light generally results in less-risky choices; with negative framing of problems, riskier choices tend to result. In a study by researchers at Dartmouth Medical School, 57% of the subjects chose a medication when presented with benefits in relative terms, whereas only 14.7% chose a medication whose benefit appeared in absolute terms. Further questioning of the patients suggested that, because the subjects ignored the underlying risk of disease, they perceived benefits as greater when expressed in relative terms.

=== Theoretical models ===
Researchers have proposed various models explaining the framing effect:

- cognitive theories, such as the fuzzy-trace theory, attempt to explain the framing-effect by determining the amount of cognitive processing effort devoted to determining the value of potential gains and losses.
- prospect theory explains the framing-effect in functional terms, determined by preferences for differing perceived values, based on the assumption that people give a greater weighting to losses than to equivalent gains.
- motivational theories explain the framing-effect in terms of hedonic forces affecting individuals, such as fears and wishes—based on the notion that negative emotions evoked by potential losses usually out-weigh the emotions evoked by hypothetical gains.
- cognitive cost-benefit trade-off theory defines choice as a compromise between desires, either as a preference for a correct decision or a preference for minimized cognitive effort. This model, which dovetails elements of cognitive and motivational theories, postulates that calculating the value of a sure gain takes much less cognitive effort than that required to select a risky gain.

=== Neuroimaging ===
Cognitive neuroscientists have linked the framing effect to neural activity in the amygdala, and have identified another brain-region, the orbital and medial prefrontal cortex (OMPFC), that appears to moderate the role of emotion on decisions. Using functional magnetic resonance imaging (fMRI) to monitor brain-activity during a financial decision-making task, they observed greater activity in the OMPFC of those research subjects less susceptible to the framing effect.

== As rhetorical criticism ==
Although the idea of language-framing had been explored earlier by Kenneth Burke (terministic screens), political communication researcher Jim A. Kuypers first published work advancing frame analysis (framing analysis) as a rhetorical perspective in 1997. His approach begins inductively by looking for themes that persist across time in a text (for Kuypers, primarily news narratives on an issue or event) and then determining how those themes are framed. Kuypers's work begins with the assumption that frames are powerful rhetorical entities that "induce us to filter our perceptions of the world in particular ways, essentially making some aspects of our multi-dimensional reality more noticeable than other aspects. They operate by making some information more salient than other information."

In his 2009 essay "Framing Analysis" in Rhetorical Criticism: Perspectives in Action and his 2010 essay "Framing Analysis as a Rhetorical Process", Kuypers offers a detailed conception for doing framing analysis from a rhetorical perspective. According to Kuypers, "Framing is a process whereby communicators, consciously or unconsciously, act to construct a point of view that encourages the facts of a given situation to be interpreted by others in a particular manner. Frames operate in four key ways: they define problems, diagnose causes, make moral judgments, and suggest remedies. Frames are often found within a narrative account of an issue or event, and are generally the central organizing idea." Kuypers's work is based on the premise that framing is a rhetorical process and as such it is best examined from a rhetorical point of view. Curing the problem is not rhetorical and best left to the observer.

== In environmental discourse ==
=== History of climate activism ===
Climate activism is constantly shaped and reshaped by dialogue at the local, national, and international level pertaining to climate change as well as by evolving societal norms and values. Beginning with the 19th century transcendental movement in which Henry David Thoreau penned his memoir Walden detailing his experiences with the natural environment and augmented by the work of other transcendentalists such as Ralph Waldo Emerson, climate activism has taken many forms. John Muir, also from the late 19th century, advocated for the preservation of Earth for its own sake, establishing the Sierra Club. Aldo Leopold's 1949 collection of essays, A Sand County Almanac, established a "land ethic" and has set the stage for modern environmental ethics, calling for conservation and preservation of nature and wilderness. Rachel Carson's Silent Spring, published in 1962, revealed the environmental and human health harms of pesticides and influenced the eventual ban of DDT in the United States in 1972

The concept of global climate change and subsequently the activism space pertaining to the climate took off in the 1970s. The first Earth Day took place on April 22, 1970. The decades following witnessed the establishment of Greenpeace, Earth First!, the United Nations Environmental Program (UNEP), and the United Nations Framework Convention on Climate Change (UNFCCC). Landmark climate documents in the last 30 years include the Rio Declaration, Kyoto Protocol, Paris Climate Agreement, Global Youth Climate Action Declaration, among others.

Most recently, the Peoples Climate March and Global Climate Strike have evolved into events attended by millions of activists and citizens around the world annually. Climate activism has been reinvigorated by an insurgence of young people on the frontlines of dialogue and advocacy. Greta Thunberg, a young Swedish woman, founded the initiative Fridays for Future which now has active chapters in scores of countries around the world. Other active youth-led climate groups include Extinction Rebellion, the Sunrise Movement, SustainUS, the Global Youth Climate Action Declaration (GYCAD), ZeroHour, among others working at both the transnational and local levels.

=== Individual motivation and acceptance ===
Individual motivation to address climate change is the bedrock on which collective action is built. Decision-making processes are informed by a myriad of factors including values, beliefs, and normative behaviors. In the United States, individuals have been most effectively motivated to support climate change policies when a public health frame has been employed. This frame reduces the sense of ambiguity and dissociation often elicited by talk of melting ice sheets and carbon emissions by placing climate issues in a local context for the individual, whether in their country, state, or city.

Climate change, as an issue that has yet to be established as a normative belief, is often subject to dissent in the face of activism and advocacy. Activists engaging in interpersonal, grassroots advocacy in order to elicit more pro-environmental conduct within their social groups, even those engaged in polite confrontation, are subject to negative reactions and social consequences in the face of opposition. Moreover, climate change has the capacity to be defined as a moral issue due to anthropogenic effects on the planet and on other human life, however there are psychological barriers to the acceptance of climate change and subsequent motivation to act in response to the need for intervention. An article in the journal Nature Climate Change by Ezra Markowitz and Azim Shariff emphasizes six psychological challenges, listed below, posed by climate change to the human moral judgement system:

1. Abstractness and cognitive complexity: the abstract nature of climate change makes it non-intuitive and cognitively effortful to grasp
2. The blamelessness of unintentional action: The human moral judgement system is finely tuned to react to intentional transgressions
3. Guilty bias: Anthropogenic climate change provokes self-defensive biases
4. Uncertainty breeds wishful thinking: The lack of definitive prognoses results in unreasonable optimism
5. Moral tribalism: The politicization of climate change fosters ideological polarization
6. Long time horizons and faraway places: Out-group victims fall by the wayside

=== Dire messaging ===
Climate activism manifests itself through a range of expressions. One aspect of climate change framing that is commonly observed is the frame of dire messaging that has been criticized as alarmist and pessimistic, resulting in a dismissal of evidence-based messages.

The just-world theory supports the notion that some individuals must rely on their presupposition of a just-world in order to substantiate beliefs. "Research on just-world theory has demonstrated that when individuals' need to believe in a just world is threatened, they commonly employ defensive responses, such as dismissal or rationalization of the information that threatened their just-world beliefs". In the case of climate change, the notion of dire messaging is critical to understanding what motivates activism. For example, having a fear of climate change "attributed to the self's incapacity to prevent it may result in withdrawal, while considering someone else responsible may result in anger".

In a 2017 study, it was found that activist interviewees from the Global North embrace fear as a motivation, but "emphasize hope, reject guilt, and treat anger with caution". Interviewees from the Global South indicated that they are "instead more acutely frightened, less hopeful, and more angered, ascribing guilt – responsibility – to northern countries. These differences may indicate a relatively depoliticized activist approach to climate change in the north, as opposed to a more politicized approach in the south."

Another 2017 study shows that fear motivates action through raising awareness of the threat of climate catastrophe. Fear's paralyzing potential is mediated by hope: Hope propels action, while collective action generates hope while also managing fear. The danger-alerting capacity of fear is embraced "internally", but is rejected as an effective emotion in motivating people to mobilize. Research has shown that dire messaging reduces the efficacy of advocacy initiatives through demotivation of individuals, lower levels of concern, and decreased engagement.

=== Positive framing ===
Research contends that prognostic framing—which offers tangible solutions, strategies, targets, and tactics—coupled with motivational framing is most efficacious in moving people to act. Especially as it relates to climate change, the power of positive psychology is made evident when applied by activists and others generating interventions.

The four main tenets of motivation as elucidated by Positive Psychology are agency, compassion, resilience, and purpose. When applied to climate action, the 4th edition textbook Psychology for Sustainability, further expands upon these tenets as they relate to sustainability and as catalysts of action:

1. Agency: Choosing, planning, and executing situation-relevant behavior
2. Compassion: Noticing, feeling, and responding to others' suffering arising from a sense of connectedness
3. Purpose: Striving toward meaningful activity
4. Resilience: Recovering from, coping with, or developing new strategies for resisting adversity

Hope augments a sense of purpose and agency, while enhancing resilience. For climate activists, it is infeasible to decouple hope from fear. However, when deconstructing the hope that others will take necessary actions, hope is generated through faith in one's own capacity, indicating that "trust in 'one's own' collective action seems to be the essence of the hope that activists talk about". Additionally, creating a link between climate action and positive emotions such as gratitude and pride, improvements in subjective well-being, and potential for impact permits individuals to perceive their own actions to better the climate as a sustainable, rewarding manner rather than as demotivating.

Another approach that has proven to be efficacious is the projection of a future utopian society in which all pressing issues have been resolved, offering creative narratives that walk individuals from current problems to future solutions and allow them to choose to serve as a bridge between the two. This intergenerational, positive approach generates a sense of excitement about climate action in individuals and offers creative solutions that they may choose to take part in. For example, a public service announcement pertaining to climate change could be framed as follows:

It's 2050, your electric vehicle is parked and ready to go next to your zero emission home, but you choose to take the extremely efficient, green, clean, rapid transit system that is accessible from most places in the United States and subsidized for low-income citizens. Maybe you live in the beautiful Appalachian mountains of West Virginia, where the coal industry became supplanted by massive hubs for green energy jobs and innovation. You can commute easily to DC or New York. Your food is locally grown and distributed through the Urban Agricultural Co-op that educates children about how to grow food, the importance of localization, and how to be more sustainable.

=== Political ideology ===
Political communication scholars adopted framing tactics since political rhetoric was around. Advances in technology have shifted the communication channels they were delivered on. From oral communication, written material, radio, television, and most recently, social media have played a prominent role in how politics is framed. Social media, in particular, allows politicians to communicate their ideologies with concise and precise messaging. Using emotional triggering words, focusing on eliciting fear or anger, to change the way the public feels about a policy is facilitated by the short attention span created by social media.

In recent decades, climate change has become deeply politicized and often, initiatives to address or conceptualize climate change are palatable to one contingency, while deeply contentious to the other. Thus, it is important to frame climate activism in a way that is tangible for the audience, finding means of communicating while minimizing provocation. In the context of the United States, left-leaning "liberals" share the core values of care, openness, egalitarianism, collective good, possess a tolerance for uncertainty or ambiguity, and an acceptance of change; while right-leaning "conservatives" share the core values of security, purity, stability, tradition, social hierarchy, order, and individualism. Research finds that framing environmental protection as consistent with the more values of "purity" and sanctity can increase conservatives support for environmental protection.

A study examining various predictors of public approval for renewable energy usage in the Western United States used seven varying frames in order to assess the efficacy of framing renewable energy. Neoliberal frameworks that are often echoed by conservatives, such as support for the free market economy, are posited against climate action interventions that inherently place constraints on the free economy through support for renewable energy through subsidies or through additional tax on nonrenewable sources of energy. Thus, when climate activists are in conversation with conservative-leaning individuals, it would be advantageous to focus on framing that does not provoke fear of constraint on the free market economy or that insinuates broad-sweeping lifestyle changes. Results of the same study support the notion that "non-climate-based frames for renewable energy are likely to garner broader public support" relative to political context and demonstrate the polarized response to climate-based framing, indicating a deep political polarization of climate change.

The idea of political framing is derived from loss aversion. Politicians want to make their idea less of a risk to potential voters since "People pay more attention to losses than to gains, just as they tend to engage in particular behaviors in the face of losses. Specifically, people take risks when they believe it helps them avert a loss, but when they face a gain, they opt for risk-averse strategies that maintain status quo". They will communicate it in a way that can convince themselves that they are not losing by agreeing with their ideology.

Political framing has also affected other policies besides climate change. Welfare, for example, has been subjected to political framing to shift public opinion on the implementation of the policy. The sheer flux of different frames is conducive to the change of public opinion throughout the years. It affects how people look at "deservedness" when it comes to welfare. One end can be seen as political credit, claiming where in-need citizens have a right to claim welfare as a necessity. It is framed as a duty from the government to citizens. In this frame, no one losses because government is doing its duty to maximize the quality of life for its entire society. The other side sees welfare retrenchment as necessary by using framing tactics to shift the blame and responsibility from the government to the citizens. The idea is to convince the public that welfare should be pushed back for their benefit. Contemporary rhetoric, championed by former U.S. President Ronald Reagan, has made the idea of "hard work" their frame to say welfare wouldn't be necessary if people "worked harder". With this contrasting frame, wealthier people are now losing because they are losing money in helping fund welfare benefits to those that "work less" than them. This different frame makes welfare seem like a zero-sum game.

=== Gender norms ===
The framing of climate change varies according to the intended audience and their perceived responses to various approaches to activism. In Sweden, research evaluating sustainability in the male-dominated transportation sector suggests that the norms provided by femininity are more likely to advance sustainability endeavors, while subsequently lowering the overall CO_{2} emissions of the sector. This is evident throughout the study, which goes on to indicate that the "mobility patterns, behavior, and attitudes of women suggest norms that are more conducive to decarbonized and more sustainable transport policies". This suggests that masculinity is often portrayed as the norm in many sectors and substantiates the link between women and a sustainability ethic that is critically missing from many male-dominated sectors and industries.

Studies indicate that consumers who exhibit a predisposition to environmentally conscious, "green" behaviors are perceived across the gender spectrum as being more feminine, enforcing a "Green Feminine" stereotype. Climate activism is viewed as an effeminate act, undermining hallmarks of masculinity and underscoring the gender gap in a care-based concern for the climate. Additionally, as a result of theories pertaining to gender-identity maintenance, "men's environmental choices can be influenced by gender cues, results showed that following a gender-identity (vs. age) threat, men were less likely to choose green products". Attributes that are associated with femininity and substantiate the cognitive association between women and green behavior include empathy and the capacity for self-transcendence.

== In law ==
Edward Zelinsky has shown that framing effects can explain some observed behaviors of legislators.

== In media ==
In media, to frame is "to select some aspects of a perceived reality and make them more salient in a communication context, in such a way as to promote a particular problem definition, causal interpretation, moral evaluation, and/or treatment recommendation for the item described". The role framing plays in the effects of media presentation has been widely discussed, with the central notion that associated perceptions of factual information can vary based upon the presentation of the information. Oftentimes journalists do not necessarily develop and use these frames consciously, but they are used as a way to organize ideas and suggest what is an issue in the media.

=== News media examples ===
In Bush's War: Media Bias and Justifications for War in a Terrorist Age, Jim A. Kuypers examined the differences in framing of the war on terror between the Bush administration and the U.S. mainstream news media between 2001 and 2005. Kuypers looked for common themes between presidential speeches and press reporting of those speeches, and then determined how the president and the press had framed those themes. By using a rhetorical version of framing analysis, Kuypers determined that the U.S. news media advanced frames counter to those used by the Bush administration:

The press actively contested the framing of the War on Terror as early as eight weeks following 9/11. This finding stands apart from a collection of communication literature suggesting the press supported the President or was insufficiently critical of the President's efforts after 9/11. To the contrary, when taking into consideration how themes are framed, [Kuypers] found that the news media framed its response in such a way that it could be viewed as supporting the idea of some action against terrorism, while concommitantly opposing the initiatives of the President. The news media may well relay what the president says, but it does not necessarily follow that it is framed in the same manner; thus, an echo of the theme, but not of the frame. The present study demonstrates, as seen in Table One [below], that shortly after 9/11 the news media was beginning to actively counter the Bush administration and beginning to leave out information important to understanding the Bush Administration's conception of the War on Terror. In sum, eight weeks after 9/11, the news media was moving beyond reporting political opposition to the President—a very necessary and invaluable press function—and was instead actively choosing themes, and framing those themes, in such a way that the President's focus was opposed, misrepresented, or ignored.

Table One: Comparison of President and News Media Themes and Frames 8 Weeks after 9/11

Themes	President's frame	Press frame
Good v. evil	Struggle of good and evil	Not mentioned
Civilization v. barbarism	Struggle of civilization v. barbarism	Not mentioned
Nature of enemy	Evil, implacable, murderers	Deadly, indiscriminant Bush administration
Nature of war	Domestic/global/enduring War	Domestic/global/longstanding War or police action
Similarity to prior wars	Different kind of war	WWII or Vietnam?
Patience	Not mentioned	Some, but running out
International effort	Stated	Minimally reported

In 1991 Robert M. Entman published findings surrounding the differences in media coverage between Korean Air Lines Flight 007 and Iran Air Flight 655. After evaluating various levels of media coverage, based on both amount of airtime and pages devoted to similar events, Entman concluded that the frames the events were presented in by the media were drastically different:

By de-emphasizing the agency and the victims and by the choice of graphics and adjectives, the news stories about the U.S. downing of an Iranian plane called it a technical problem, while the Soviet downing of a Korean jet was portrayed as a moral outrage ... [T]he contrasting news frames employed by several important U.S. media outlets in covering these two tragic misapplications of military force. For the first, the frame emphasized the moral bankruptcy and guilt of the perpetrating nation, for the second, the frame de-emphasized the guilt and focused on the complex problems of operating military high technology.

Differences in coverage amongst various media outlets:

Amounts of media coverage dedicated to each event	Korean Air	Iran Air
Time and Newsweek	51 pages	20 pages
CBS	303 minutes	204 minutes
The New York Times	286 stories	102 stories

In 1988 Irwin Levin and Gary Gaeth did a study on the effects of framing attribute information on consumers before and after consuming a product (1988). In this study, they found that in a study on beef, people who ate beef labeled as 75% lean rated it more favorably than people whose beef was labelled 25% fat. In the COVID-19 pandemic, the use of loss vs. gain framing was studied in the use of messages communication COVID-19 risk to the public. Messages framed in terms of gain would say "Wear a mask, save lives". Messages framed in terms of loss would say "if you do not wear a mask, lives will be lost". Results of this studies showed there was no impact on (1) behavioral intentions to follow guidelines to prevent COVID-19 transmission, (2) attitudes to- ward COVID-19 prevention policies, (3) whether participants chose to seek more information about COVID-19, however there was increased self reported anxiety when messages from the media where framed in loss.

== In politics ==
Linguist and rhetoric scholar George Lakoff argues that, in order to persuade a political audience of one side of an argument or another, the facts must be presented through a rhetorical frame. It is argued that, without the frame, the facts of an argument become lost on an audience, making the argument less effective. The rhetoric of politics uses framing to present the facts surrounding an issue in a way that creates the appearance of a problem at hand that requires a solution. Politicians using framing to make their own solution to an exigence appear to be the most appropriate compared to that of the opposition. Counter-arguments become less effective in persuading an audience once one side has framed an argument, because it is argued that the opposition then has the additional burden of arguing the frame of the issue in addition to the issue itself.

Framing a political issue, a political party or a political opponent is a strategic goal in politics, particularly in the United States. Both the Democratic and Republican political parties compete to successfully harness its power of persuasion. According to The New York Times:

Even before the election, a new political word had begun to take hold of the party, beginning on the West Coast and spreading like a virus all the way to the inner offices of the Capitol. That word was "framing." Exactly what it means to "frame" issues seems to depend on which Democrat you are talking to, but everyone agrees that it has to do with choosing the language to define a debate and, more important, with fitting individual issues into the contexts of broader story lines.

—

Because framing can alter the public's perception, politicians disagree on how issues are framed. Hence, the way the issues are framed in the media reflects who is winning the battle. For instance, according to Robert Entman, professor of Communication at George Washington University, in the build-up to the Gulf War the conservatives were successful in making the debate whether to attack sooner or later, with no mention of the possibility of not attacking.

One particular example of Lakoff's work that attained some degree of fame was his advice to rename trial lawyers (unpopular in the United States) as "public protection attorneys". Though Americans have not generally adopted this suggestion, the Association of Trial Lawyers of America did rename themselves the "American Association of Justice", in what the Chamber of Commerce called an effort to hide their identity.

The New York Times depicted similar intensity among Republicans:

In one recent memo, titled "The 14 Words Never to Use," [Frank] Luntz urged conservatives to restrict themselves to phrases from what he calls ... the "New American Lexicon." Thus, a smart Republican, in Luntz's view, never advocates "drilling for oil"; he prefers "exploring for energy." He should never criticize the "government," which cleans our streets and pays our firemen; he should attack "Washington," with its ceaseless thirst for taxes and regulations. "We should never use the word outsourcing," Luntz wrote, "because we will then be asked to defend or end the practice of allowing companies to ship American jobs overseas."

—

From a political perspective, framing has widespread consequences. For example, the concept of framing links with that of agenda-setting: by consistently invoking a particular frame, the framing party may effectively control discussion and perception of the issue. Sheldon Rampton and John Stauber in Trust Us, We're Experts illustrate how public-relations (PR) firms often use language to help frame a given issue, structuring the questions that then subsequently emerge. For example, one firm advises clients to use "bridging language" that uses a strategy of answering questions with specific terms or ideas in order to shift the discourse from an uncomfortable topic to a more comfortable one. Practitioners of this strategy might attempt to draw attention away from one frame in order to focus on another. As Lakoff notes, "On the day that George W. Bush took office, the words "tax relief" started coming out of the White House." By refocusing the structure away from one frame ("tax burden" or "tax responsibilities"), individuals can set the agenda of the questions asked in the future.

Cognitive linguists point to an example of framing in the phrase "tax relief". In this frame, use of the concept "relief" entails a concept of (without mentioning the benefits resulting from) taxes putting strain on the citizen:

The current tax code is full of inequities. Many single moms face higher marginal tax rates than the wealthy. Couples frequently face a higher tax burden after they marry. The majority of Americans cannot deduct their charitable donations. Family farms and businesses are sold to pay the death tax. And the owners of the most successful small businesses share nearly half of their income with the government. President Bush's tax cut will greatly reduce these inequities. It is a fair plan that is designed to provide tax relief to everyone who pays income taxes.

—

Alternative frames may emphasize the concept of taxes as a source of infrastructural support to businesses:

The truth is that the wealthy have received more from America than most Americans—not just wealth but the infrastructure that has allowed them to amass their wealth: banks, the Federal Reserve, the stock market, the Securities and Exchange Commission, the legal system, federally sponsored research, patents, tax supports, the military protection of foreign investments, and much much more. American taxpayers support the infrastructure of wealth accumulation. It is only fair that those who benefit most should pay their fair share.

—

Frames can limit debate by setting the vocabulary and metaphors through which participants can comprehend and discuss an issue. They form a part not just of political discourse, but of cognition. In addition to generating new frames, politically oriented framing research aims to increase public awareness of the connection between framing and reasoning.

=== Examples ===
- The initial response of the Bush administration to the assault of September 11, 2001 was to frame the acts of terror as crime. This framing was replaced within hours by a war metaphor, yielding the "war on terror". The difference between these two framings is in the implied response. Crime connotes bringing criminals to justice, putting them on trial and sentencing them, whereas as war implies enemy territory, military action and war powers for government.
- The term "escalation" to describe an increase in American troop-levels in Iraq in 2007 implied that the United States deliberately increased the scope of conflict in a provocative manner and possibly implies that U.S. strategy entails a long-term military presence in Iraq, whereas "surge" framing implies a powerful but brief, transitory increase in intensity.
- "Bad Apple" Frame
  - The "bad apple" frame, as in the proverb "one bad apple spoils the barrel". This frame implies that removing one underachieving or corrupt official from an institution will solve a given problem; an opposing frame presents the same problem as systematic or structural to the institution itself—a source of infectious and spreading rot.
  - This frame connects to a theory on diagnostic framing within social movements which focuses on identifying the problem. Although a clear metaphor, it's used to direct blame. The metaphor paints a clear and familiar picture to elicit, often, negative assumptions.
- "Taxpayers Money" Frame
  - The "taxpayers money" frame, rather than public or government funds, which implies that individual taxpayers have a claim or right to set government policy based upon their payment of tax rather than their status as citizens or voters and that taxpayers have a right to control public funds that are the shared property of all citizens and also privileges individual self-interest above group interest.
  - Using this frame primes for economic identity making individuals more sensitive to cost. This increases opposition public goods.
- "Collective Property" frame
  - The "collective property" frame, which implies that property owned by individuals is really owned by a collective in which those individuals are members. This collective can be a territorial one, such as a nation, or an abstract one that does not map to a specific territory.
- Program-names that may describe only the intended effects of a program but may also imply their effectiveness. These include the following:
  - "Foreign aid" (which implies that spending money will aid foreigners, rather than harm them)
  - "Social security" (which implies that the program can be relied on to provide security for a society)
  - "Stabilization policy" (which implies that a policy will have a stabilizing effect).
- Based on opinion polling and focus groups, EcoAmerica, a nonprofit environmental marketing and messaging firm, has advanced the position that global warming is an ineffective framing due to its identification as a leftist advocacy issue. The organization has suggested to government officials and environmental groups that alternate formulations of the issues would be more effective.
- In her 2009 book Frames of War, Judith Butler argues that the justification within liberal-democracies for war, and atrocities committed in the course of war, (referring specifically to the current war in Iraq and to Abu Ghraib and Guantanamo Bay) entails a framing of the (especially Muslim) 'other' as pre-modern/primitive and ultimately not human in the same way as citizens within the liberal order.
- Political leaders provide their personal photographers and videographers with access to private moments that are off-limits to journalists. The news media then faces an ethical dilemma of whether to republish freely available digital handouts that project the politician's desired frame, but which might be newsworthy.
- The Abu Ghraib Prison Scandal happened during the War on Terror in the early 2000s. The prison in Iraq was run by U.S military personnel and hired contractors and used to detain Iraqis who were suspected of insurgency or security threats. The scandal happened when the public found out that extensive and unnecessary amounts of torture were being subjected to the prisoners, specifically taking place in the U.S. ran sector of the prison. These are the facts about what happened; however, how the scandal was being framed in the American press told a different story. Torture was taking place in Abu Ghraib, yet the first statements that came out from the Bush administration called it isolated cases of mistreatment and abuse being performed by low-level soldiers. This worked in their favor, and the media grabbed hold of that idea, with 80% of news articles that were about Abu Ghraib from being labeled as abuse, and only 17% mentioned torture. Due to framing, the severity of the situation was downplayed. The facts were out there, and yet the public image of the administration and its choices was upheld.

== Framing and technology ==
Framing theory was applied to the specifics of technology and technology management in the 1990s, leading to the development of technology framing theory (TFT). TFT posits that people perceive technology through frames, called technological frames. Technological frames refer to how individuals subjectively perceive the nature and role of technology, where technology is understood to mean tools by which humans transform parts of their environment, derived from human knowledge, to be used for human purposes. Technological frames encompass people's assumptions, expectations, usage scenarios, and potential outcomes such as facilitating a task. They guide how people categorize and assess a technology's usefulness relative to other technologies. In organizational contexts, individual frames of employees can transform into collective frames across organizational hierarchies and functional units.

Technology framing theory has been applied and tested in various studies that show the negative influence of incongruent frames, when actors do perceive technology differently, leading to different frames, and the positive influence of congruent frames. However, inconsistent findings point to the need to further develop the theory. For example, in some contexts frame incongruence can lead to positive outcomes if it helps managers to distance themselves from political contests or if it helps avoid organizations falling in a myopic habit trap, encouraging creative explorations of new ways to organize.

In an extension of technology framing theory it was shown that in addition to the importance of frame (in)congruence in organizational technology framing, consistency of frames over time and across groups matter as well.

== Effectiveness ==
According to Susan T. Fiske and Shelley E. Taylor, human beings are by nature "cognitive misers", meaning they prefer to do as little thinking as possible. Frames provide people a quick and easy way to process information. Hence, people will use the previously mentioned mental filters (a series of which is called a schema) to make sense of incoming messages. This gives the sender and framer of the information enormous power to use these schemas to influence how the receivers will interpret the message.

A 2020 published theory suggests that judged usability (i.e., the extent to which a consideration featured in the message is deemed usable for a given subsequent judgment) may be an important mediator of cognitive media effects like framing, agenda setting, and priming. Emphasizing judged usability leads to the revelation that media coverage may not just elevate a particular consideration, but may also actively suppress a consideration, rendering it less usable for subsequent judgments. The news framing process illustrates that among different aspects of an issue, a certain aspect is chosen over others to characterize an issue or event. For example, the issue of unemployment is described in terms of the cheap labor provided by immigrants. Exposure to the news story activates thoughts correspond to immigrants rather than thoughts related to other aspects of the issue (e.g., legislation, education, and cheap imports from other countries) and, at the same time, makes the former thoughts prominent by promoting their importance and relevance to the understanding of the issue at hand. That is, issue perceptions are influenced by the consideration featured in the news story. Thoughts related to neglected considerations become relegated to the degree that thoughts about a featured consideration are magnified.

== See also ==
- Anecdotal value
- Alternative facts
- Argumentation theory
- Bias
- Choice architecture
- Code word (figure of speech)
- Communication theory
- Connotation
- Cultural bias
- Decision making
- Definition of the situation
- Demagoguery
- Died by suicide vs committed suicide
- Dispositif
- Domain of discourse
- Echo chamber (media)
- Fallacy of many questions
- False consciousness
- Figure of speech
- Filter bubble
- Framing rules in the thought of Arlie Russell Hochschild
- Freedom of speech
- Free press
- Gestell
- Heresthetic
- Language and thought
- Meme
- Metaphorical Framing
- Newspeak
- Overton window
- Plus-size rather than fat
- Political correctness
- Power word
- Rhetorical device
- Semantics
- Semantic domain
- Sensemaking
- Social heuristics
- Sophism
- Spin (propaganda)
- Stovepiping
- Thought Reform (book)
- Trope
- Unspeak (book)
- Virtue word
