= Framing effect (psychology) =

Bias in which choices are influenced by the options' connotations

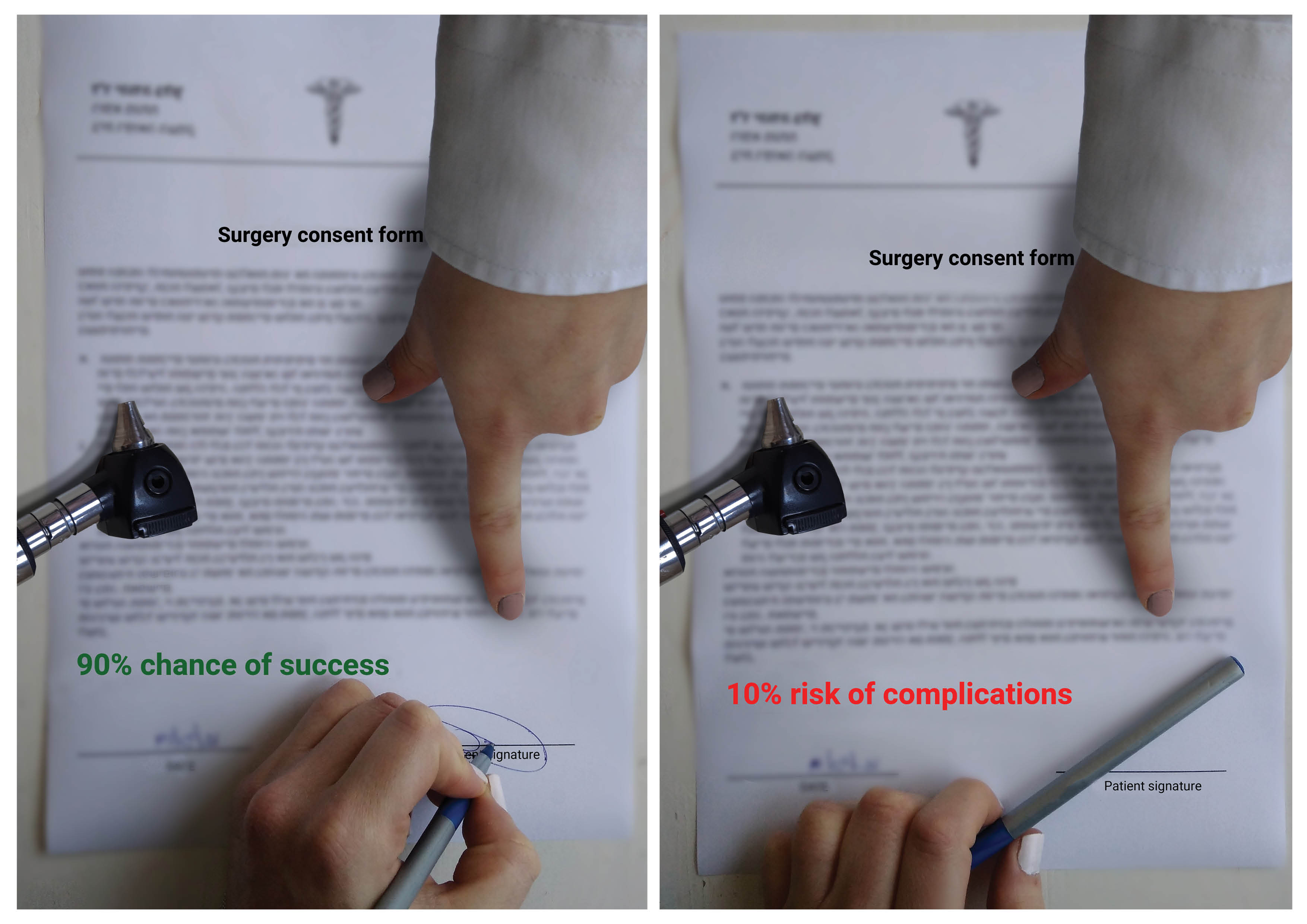
sample illustration of a framing effect

Framing effect is a cognitive bias where people's decisions change depending on how options or statements are framed, even when they are logically identical. Studies show that when both choices are framed positively as gains, the majority of people prefer a certain gain over a probable gain. On the other hand, when both choices are framed negatively as losses, people tend to choose an uncertain loss over an inevitable loss. Though the choices across the positive and negative framing conditions are logically equivalent, people in different conditions make different decisions. Gain and loss are defined within the scenario as outcomes, for example, lives lost or saved, patients treated or not treated, monetary gains or losses.

Prospect theory posits that a loss is more significant than the equivalent gain, that a sure gain (certainty effect and pseudocertainty effect) is favored over a probabilistic gain, and that a probabilistic loss is preferred to a definite loss. One of the dangers of framing effects is that people are often provided with options within the context of only one of the two frames.

Valence-framing implicates attitudinal changes in attitudinal conceptualization. Statements oriented negatively ("I oppose") result in greater levels of attitude resistance and certainty as compared to positive statements ("I support") even when both statements are aimed toward the same logical end.

The concept helps to develop an understanding of frame analysis within social movements, and also in the formation of political opinion where spin plays a large role in political opinion polls that are framed to encourage a response beneficial to the organization that has commissioned the poll. It has been suggested that the use of the technique is discrediting political polls themselves. The effect is reduced, or even eliminated, if ample credible information is provided to people.

== History ==
=== The rational actor model ===
The rational actor model is a theoretical framework used by economists to understand human decision-making at the individual level. It assumes that people act in rational ways that optimize their interests. The model includes several core assumptions: rational actors have stable preferences, access to all relevant information, the capability to analyze all possible options and outcomes, and are unbiased and unemotional. This model has been influential in many social science disciplines, including economics and political science. Psychologists have criticized the rational actor model by arguing that its assumptions do not accurately reflect real-world human decision-making behavior. They point out that the time and cognitive resources available to individuals are insufficient for deliberate analysis of every situation. In practice, decision-making is often affected by emotion, social context, and Heuristic Since then, psychologists have conducted extensive research on the systematic biases and errors that influence human judgment and decision-making.

=== Social psychology perspective: Prospect Theory ===
Tversky and Kahneman proposed a new theoretical frame to understand decision-making in their 1981 paper, "The Framing of Decisions and the Psychology of Choice." They are major contributors in the domain of the psychology of decision-making. They proposed prospect theory, which, unlike traditional economic theories that assume people make rational choices by calculating risks and benefits, recognizes that people make biased or inconsistent decisions in real life based on how options are presented—or, in other words, framed.

In the same paper, they conducted an experiment to test participants with the classic question, the Asian disease problem: participants were asked to choose between two treatments. The researchers manipulated two independent variables: framing of options (positive vs. negative) and certainty of outcomes (certain vs. risky)

Participants were asked to choose between two treatments for 600 people affected by a deadly disease. Treatment A was predicted to result in 400 deaths, whereas treatment B had a 33% chance that no one would die but a 66% chance that everyone would die. This choice was then presented to participants either with positive framing, i.e. how many people would live, or with negative framing, i.e. how many people would die.

Framing	Treatment A ( The certain option)	Treatment B (The risky option)	majority choice
Positive	"Saves 200 lives"	"A 33% chance of saving all 600 people, 66% possibility of saving no one."	Treatment A
Negative	"400 people will die"	"A 33% chance that no people will die, 66% probability that all 600 will die."	Treatment B

Treatment A was chosen by 72% of participants when it was presented with positive framing ("saves 200 lives"). When the question was negatively framed, the result reversed, and 78% of participants chose Treatment B.

In the paper they coauthored later in 1984, Kahneman and Tversky made two addition to their original theory. First, they discussed how people reason about probability. They pointed out that people do not treat probability logically, instead tending to overestimate the likelihood of low-probability events (like winning the lottery) while underestimating events with moderate to high probability. They also introduced the concept of mental accounting—for example, people treat losing a $10 bill differently from losing a $10 movie ticket, even though the monetary loss is the same.

In his later work, Kahneman further developed the theoretical framework of decision-making by introducing the concept of dual systems. In his 2011 book Thinking, Fast and Slow, he described two modes of thinking: one system is automatic, intuitive, and emotional, operating effortlessly and responsible for generating quick judgments and impressions. The other system is logical, deliberate, and effortful, responsible for complex tasks and self-control. People are more vulnerable to framing effects when relying on the intuitive system, as it is more susceptible to contextual cues and surface-level presentation.

=== Social cognitive psychology perspective: Valence-framing and attitudes ===
Expanding upon research that viewed framing effects as it related to outcomes or issues, Bizer and Petty (2005) find that framing effects are implicated with attitudes as well. The authors illuminate that negatively-valenced attitudes (for example: opposing current policy) as contrasted with positively-valenced attitudes (for example: supporting policy reform) resulted in participants displaying greater resistance to counterattitudinal messages.

In contrast to earlier research such as McGuire's inoculation theory that states that individuals exposed to arguments with weak counterarguments will foster resistance to attitudes, valence-framing offers a perspective on how attitudes are able to be strengthened and made resistant to counterattitudinal challenges in a relatively low-effort manner.

Subsequent research on the valence-framing effect validates Bizer and Petty's initial finding. Bizer, Larsen and Petty (2011) elucidate that negatively-framed attitudes increases the likelihood of engaging in attitude-aligned behaviors as well as increasing certainty toward the attitude object.

Whereas preceding research focused on authenticating the generalizability of the valence-framing effect, there has been little consideration as to the mediators of the valence-framing effect. Bizer, Žeželj and Luguri (2010) find that the level of cognitive processing is a mediator in the valence-framing effect. Specifically, the authors find that valence-framing effects were more pronounced in participants who are able to elaborate on their attitudes (participants that are motivated and not under cognitive load) as opposed to participants who are not able to elaborate on their attitudes (participants who do not view the attitude as particularly relevant, or are under cognitive load).

Valence-framing operates as a cognitive bias as it impacts participant attitude through manipulating word choices ("oppose" vs "support"). Extensive research on biases indicate that biases are mediated or controlled when individuals effortfully process information that is given to them. Contrary to this information, however, valence-framing shares the same conditions necessary for effortful processing: motivation and ability.

=== Extensionality violation ===
In logic, extensionality requires "two formulas which have the same truth-value under any truth-assignments to be mutually substitutable salva veritate in a sentence that contains one of these formulas." Put simply, objects that have the same external properties are equal. This principle, applied to decision making, suggests that making a decision in a problem should not be affected by how the problem is described. For example, varied descriptions of the same decision problem should not give rise to different decisions, due to the extensionality principle. If judgments are made on the basis of irrelevant information as described, that is called an extensionality violation.

== Influence: real world application ==
Framing effects have powerful real-world influences. They shape decision-making across a broad range of domains and contexts—for example, in public health, education, politics, law, and economics. Even when options are logically identical, subtle shifts in wording—such as presenting outcomes as gains or losses—can reverse preferences.

More recent research has examined framing in vaccine communication. A 2026 discrete choice experiment involving 907 U.S. adults found that, compared with framing COVID-19 vaccination as a government recommendation, framing vaccination as a means of preserving personal freedom was associated with higher stated vaccine acceptance among respondents with greater vaccine hesitancy, but not among those with lower hesitancy. Framing vaccination as a way to protect others was associated with higher acceptance across hesitancy levels.

This effect has been shown in other contexts:

- 93% of PhD students registered early when a penalty fee for late registration was emphasized, but only 67% did so when this was presented as a discount for earlier registration.
- 62% of people disagreed with allowing "public condemnation of democracy", but only 46% of people agreed that it was right to "forbid public condemnation of democracy".
- More people will support an economic policy if the employment rate is emphasized than when the associated unemployment rate is highlighted.
- It has been argued that pretrial detention may increase a defendant's willingness to accept a plea bargain, since imprisonment, rather than freedom, will be their baseline, and pleading guilty will be viewed as an event that will cause their earlier release rather than as an event that will put them in prison.
- In a field experiment, about 30% of new users of Acorns, a savings app, enrolled in a recurring deposit framed as $5 a day, compared with about 7% when the same amount was framed as $150 a month. The daily framing also eliminated the difference in participation between higher- and lower-income users that appeared under the monthly frame.

== Developmental factors ==
The framing effect has consistently been shown to be one of the largest biases in decision making. In general, susceptibility to framing effects increases with age. Age difference factors are particularly important when considering health care and financial decisions.

However, the framing effect seems to diminish when encountered in a foreign (non-native) language. One explanation of this disappearance is that a non-native language provides greater cognitive and emotional distance than one's native tongue. A foreign language is also processed less automatically than a native tongue. This leads to more deliberation, which can affect decision making, resulting in decisions that are more systematic.

=== Childhood and adolescence ===
Framing effects in decision-making become stronger as children age. This is partially because qualitative reasoning increases with age. While preschoolers are more likely to make decisions based on quantitative properties, such as probability of an outcome, elementary schoolers and adolescents become progressively more likely to reason qualitatively, opting for a sure option in a gain frame and a risky option in a loss frame regardless of probabilities. The increase in qualitative thinking is related to an increase in "gist based" thinking that occurs over a lifetime.

However, qualitative reasoning, and thus susceptibility to framing effects, is still not as strong in adolescents as in adults, and adolescents are more likely than adults to choose the risky option under both the gain and loss frames of a given scenario. One explanation for adolescent tendencies toward risky choices is that they lack real-world experience with negative consequences, and thus over-rely on conscious evaluation of risks and benefits, focusing on specific information and details or quantitative analysis. This reduces influence of framing effects and leads to greater consistency across frames of a given scenario. Children between the ages of 10 and 12 are more likely to take risks and show framing effects, while younger children only considered the quantitative differences between the two options presented.

=== Young adulthood ===
Younger adults are more likely than older adults to be enticed by risk-taking when presented with loss frame trials.

In multiple studies of undergraduate students, researchers have found that students are more likely to prefer options framed positively. For example, they are more likely to enjoy meat labeled 75% lean meat as opposed to 25% fat, or use condoms advertised as being 95% effective as opposed to having a 5% risk of failure.

Young adults are especially susceptible to framing effects when presented with an ill-defined problem in which there is no correct answer and individuals must arbitrarily determine what information they consider relevant. For example, undergraduate students are more willing to purchase an item such as a movie ticket after losing an amount equivalent to the item's cost than after losing the item itself.

=== Older adulthood ===
The framing effect is claimed to be greater in older adults than in younger adults or adolescents. This claim may be a result of enhanced negativity bias, though some sources claim that the negativity bias actually decreases with age.

In particular, this increased susceptibility to the framing effect manifested itself mainly in response to negative frames. Positive framings were not found to have a significant effect on the framing effect in older adults. This may be due in part to socioemotional selectivity theory, where the increased age shifts the focus of adults from risk taking to maximizing their emotional experiences in the present, hence the increased framing in the negative frame. The dual process theory may also play a role as negative framings evoke less heightened responses, leading to the deployment of the implicit processes. The implicit process is found to be frame-sensitive, and thus may be the reason why framing is pronounced in negative frames for older adults.

Another possible cause is that older adults have fewer cognitive resources available to them and are more likely to default to less cognitively demanding strategies when faced with a decision. They tend to rely on easily accessible information, or frames, regardless of whether that information is relevant to making the decision in question. Several studies have shown that younger adults will make less biased decisions than older adults because they base their choices on interpretations of patterns of events and can better employ decision making strategies that require cognitive resources like working-memory skills. Older adults, on the other hand, make choices based on immediate reactions to gains and losses.

Older adults' lack of cognitive resources, such as flexibility in decision making strategies, may cause older adults to be influenced by emotional frames more so than younger adults or adolescents. In addition, as individuals age, they make decisions more quickly than their younger counterparts. It is significant that, when prompted to do so, older adults will often make a less biased decision with reevaluation of their original choice.

The increase in framing effects among older adults has important implications, especially in medical contexts. Older adults are influenced heavily by the inclusion or exclusion of extraneous details, meaning they are likely to make serious medical decisions based on how doctors frame the two options rather than the qualitative differences between the options, causing older adults to inappropriately form their choices.

When considering cancer treatments, framing can shift older adults' focus from short- to long-term survival under a negative and positive frame, respectively. When presented with treatment descriptions described in positive, negative, or neutral terms, older adults are significantly more likely to agree to a treatment when it is positively described than they are to agree to the same treatment when it is described neutrally or negatively. Additionally, framing often leads to inconsistency in choice: a change in description qualities after an initial choice is made can cause older adults to revoke their initial decision in favor of an alternative option. Older adults also remember positively framed statements more accurately than negatively framed statements. This has been demonstrated by evaluating older adults' recall of statements in pamphlets about health care issues.

== See also ==
- Choice architecture
- Context effect
- Fuzzy-trace theory
- Is the glass half empty or half full?
- List of cognitive biases
- Mental accounting
- Metaphorical framing
- Motivated reasoning
- Overton window
- Prospect theory
- Status quo bias
- Thinking, Fast and Slow
