= Jim A. Kuypers =

American media critic

Jim Kuypers
- Education: Florida State University; Louisiana State University
- Occupations: Professor, Business and Political Communication Consultant

Jim A. Kuypers, also known professionally as J. Andrew Kuypers, is an American scholar and consultant specializing in communication studies. A full professor at Virginia Tech, he has written on the news media, rhetorical criticism and presidential rhetoric, and is particularly known for his work in political communication which explores the qualitative aspects of framing analysis and its relationship to presidential communication and news media bias. As a consultant, Kuypers provides workshops, keynotes, coaching, and seminars on public speaking, leadership, strategic communication, performance anxiety reduction, conflict avoidance, and integrating human skills such as creativity and critical thinking with artificial intelligence.

== Career ==
Kuypers graduated with a Bachelor of Science and a Master of Arts from Florida State University. He was a senior lecturer in rhetoric and oratory, Director of speech at Dartmouth College, taught at Florida State University, and Florida Atlantic University. He taught at Louisiana State University, where he earned a Ph.D. in communication studies. Since 2005 Kuypers has been teaching at Virginia Tech. In addition to his academic roles, Kuypers has worked as a business and political communication consultant for over 25 years, using the professional name J. Andrew Kuypers.

== Consulting career ==
Kuypers operates a consulting practice under the name J. Andrew Kuypers through his firm, J. Andrew Communication. With over 25 years of experience and as author and editor of 17 books, he offers tailored coaching, workshops, weekend seminars, and keynotes aimed at career advancement and professional development. His services focus on public speaking instruction, strategic communication, performance anxiety reduction techniques, motivational speeches, conflict avoidance, employee well-being, authenticity, resilience, networking, and the integration of human skills (such as creativity, critical thinking, and empathy) with artificial intelligence in the workplace. Kuypers also publishes a free weekly newsletter, Your Remarkable Edge, providing tips on AI, creativity, communication skills, and human development. He is represented by the Academic Speakers Bureau for booking engagements. Kuypers maintains an active presence on social media, including X (formerly Twitter) under the handle @jakuypers.

== Scholarship ==
Kuypers' work falls into two categories: political communication and rhetorical criticism. The former spans both communication and political science, involving the study of the political rhetoric of individuals and groups. For Kuypers, politics is a process that takes place through communication, rather than the sheer exercise or attempt at power.

== Political communication ==
Kuypers searches for media bias, and how the news media frames political news. He developed a qualitative (rhetorical) version of framing analysis designed to look for bias, and to understand how the original messages of political actors are reframed by the press before transmitted to the public. He has investigated how news broadcasts, stories, and editorials shape public understanding of issues and events in a particular direction. Quote: "Framing is a process whereby communicators, consciously or unconsciously, act to construct a point of view that encourages the facts of a given situation to be interpreted by others in a particular manner. Frames operate in four key ways: they define problems, diagnose causes, make moral judgments, and suggest remedies. Frames are often found within a narrative account of an issue or event, and are generally the central organizing idea."

== A framing analysis trilogy ==
=== Presidential Crisis Rhetoric and the Press ===
Kuypers' first major work examining framing, politics, and the news media was the 1997 book Presidential Crisis Rhetoric and the Press in the Post-Cold War World. In this work he examined the changed nature of presidential crisis rhetoric since the ending of the cold war, and first advanced a qualitative version of comparative framing analysis. It was here that he first used the term "agenda-extension" to describe a process where the news media "beyond the strict reporting of events" and instead foster a particular understanding of an issue or event. In relation to other theories of the press, Kuypers argues that "agenda-extension begins when media gatekeepers decide to publish a particular story because issues are often framed by station managers, producers, or editors by how they decide to tell a particular story. Although deciding what story to tell (gate-keeping) is the first step in all news reporting, the press takes a second step when determining how much attention to give to the story (agenda-setting), and a third step when they determine how to tell the story (agenda-extension).

=== Press Bias and Politics ===
In his 2002 book Press Bias and Politics: How the Media Frame Controversial Issues Kuypers comparatively analyzed the speeches of five public figures, ranging from ministers to presidents from 1995 to 2000. He examined approximately 700 press reports on controversial issues that were published in 116 different newspapers. He reports finding a "left of center bias in mainstream press reporting". Kuypers puts forward four distinct journalistic practices allowing bias to seep into reporting. He concludes that only "a narrow brand of liberal thought" was supported by the press, with "all other positions shut out or shut down". Kuypers has stated in an interview with the Cybercast News Service that "this bias hurts the democratic process in general" and that the U.S. mainstream press "is an anti-democratic institution".

=== Bush's War ===
Kuypers' third book was Bush's War: Media Bias and Justifications for War in a Terrorist Age. According to Kuypers, "The idea [in the book was to] look for themes about 9-11 and the War on Terror that the President used, and then look at what themes the press used when reporting on what the president said. After identifying themes, I determine how those themes are framed. Through this comparative analysis, we can detect differences in the frames presented to the American people, and determine the nature of any press bias." Kuypers found that the news media echoed the president's themes and the framing of those themes immediately following 9/11. But just eight weeks later, the press had changed its manner of reporting, was actually framing Bush as an enemy of civil liberties, and was actively helping critics of the president.

== Framing analysis and moral foundations theory ==
=== President Trump and the News Media: Moral Foundations, Framing, and the Nature of Press Bias in America ===
In this work Kuypers incorporates elements of Moral Foundations Theory to investigate the ideological underpinnings of press reports. Using a rhetorical version of framing analysis, he analyzes four major speeches by President Trump and compares them with the reporting on those speeches by the mainstream news media. The moral foundations of both Trump and the news media are examined to assess their respective moral/ideological underpinnings. The results both extends and refutes parts of framing theory by demonstrating how frames do not give rise to moral assessments as previously thought, but rather the presence of moral foundations provide moral substance to frames as they are developed and found throughout news coverage. These results, the first combining framing analysis and moral foundations theory in this manner, reveal how journalists inject bias consciously and unconsciously into hard news stories, and that their moral foundations act to privilege liberal concerns and denigrate conservative concerns. Kuypers argues in this work that the news media framing acted to treat President Trump not as a source of news, but as a political opponent while at the same time helping the political opposition of the President. By evaluating journalistic practices through the lens of their own published ethical standards, Kuypers argues that contemporary journalistic practices are damaging the American Republic and makes the case for immediate incorporation of viewpoint diversity within news organizations.

== Rhetorical criticism ==
Kuypers edited the 2009 book Rhetorical Criticism: Perspectives in Action in which he explains rhetoric and rhetorical criticism, and presents 16 different perspectives on how to perform rhetorical criticism. Kuypers has written about "rhetorical criticism" and tried to explain "advocacy based criticism" in his 2000 article "Must We All Be Political Activists?" and the 2001 article "Criticism, Politics, and Objectivity: Redivivus".

In his latest work on rhetorical criticism, "Purpose, Practice, and Pedagogy in Rhetorical Criticism", Kuypers brings together 15 nationally and internationally recognized rhetorical critics who each contribute a chapter examining the three areas mentioned in the title of the book. According to Kuypers, the chapter authors "enter into the continuing discussion about the purpose of criticism, yet move beyond this to address on a personal level how they actually perform criticism, and also how they actually teach criticism to others. All the authors in this book agree on the societal importance of knowledge about the creation and critique of rhetoric. Additionally, the authors collectively provide wide ranging and strong justifications for teaching rhetorical criticism."

== Selected publications ==
=== Books ===
- Kuypers, Jim A., ed. A Future for the News: What's Wrong with Mainstream News Media in America and How to Fix It. Lanham, MD: Rowman & Littlefield, 2024. ISBN 978-1538180235
- Kuypers, Jim A., ed. Public Communication in the Time of COVID-19: Perspectives from the Communication Discipline on the Pandemic. Lanham, MD: Lexington Books, 2022. ISBN 978-1793643667
- Kuypers, Jim A., ed. Personal and Administrative Perspectives from the Communication Discipline during COVID-19. Lanham, MD: Lexington Books, 2022.
- Kuypers, Jim A., ed. Rhetorical Criticism: Perspectives in Action. 3rd ed. Lanham, MD: Rowman & Littlefield, 2021. ISBN 978-1538138144
- Kuypers, Jim A. President Trump and the News Media: Moral Foundations, Framing, and the Nature of Press Bias in America. Lanham, MD: Lexington Books, 2020. ISBN 978-1793626042
- Valenzano, Joseph M. III; Kuypers, Jim A.; and Braden, Stephen W. The Speaker: The Tradition and Practice of Public Speaking. 4th ed. Southlake, TX: Fountainhead Press, 2019. ISBN 978-1680368642
- Kuypers, Jim A., ed. The 2016 American Presidential Campaign and the News Media: Implications for the American Republic and Democracy. Lanham, MD: Lexington Books, 2018. ISBN 978-1498565110
- Kuypers, Jim A., ed. Purpose, Practice, and Pedagogy in Rhetorical Criticism. Lanham, MD: Lexington Books, 2014. ISBN 978-1498557221
- Kuypers, Jim A. Partisan Journalism: A History of Media Bias in the United States. Lanham, MD: Rowman & Littlefield, 2014. ISBN 978-1-4422-2593-0
- Aamidor, Abe; Kuypers, Jim A.; and Wiesinger, Susan. Media Smackdown: Deconstructing the News and the Future of Journalism. New York: Peter Lang, 2013. ISBN 978-1-4331-2093-0
- D’Angelo, Paul; and Kuypers, Jim A., eds. Doing News Framing Analysis: Empirical and Theoretical Perspectives. New York: Routledge, 2010. ISBN 978-0-415-99236-7
- Denton, Robert E.; and Kuypers, Jim A. Politics and Communication in America: Campaigns, Media, and Governing in the 21st Century. Long Grove, IL: Waveland Press, 2008. ISBN 1-57766-533-3
- Kuypers, Jim A. Bush’s War: Media Bias and Justifications for War in a Terrorist Age. Lanham, MD: Rowman & Littlefield, 2006. ISBN 0-7425-3653-X
- Kuypers, Jim A., ed. The Art of Rhetorical Criticism. Boston: Allyn & Bacon, 2005. ISBN 0-205-37141-8
- Kuypers, Jim A. Press Bias and Politics: How the Media Frame Controversial Issues. Westport, CT: Praeger, 2002. ISBN 0-275-97759-5
- Kuypers, Jim A.; and King, Andrew, eds. Twentieth-Century Roots of Rhetorical Studies. Westport, CT: Praeger, 2001. ISBN 0-275-96420-5
- Kuypers, Jim A. Presidential Crisis Rhetoric and the Press in the Post-Cold War World. Westport, CT: Praeger, 1997. ISBN 0-275-95721-7

=== Selected articles ===
- Horning, Mike; and Kuypers, Jim A. “Conservative and Liberal Social Media ‘Arguments’ as Community Confirmation: A Rhetorical and Computer Assisted Analysis.” Argumentation and Advocacy 60 (2) (2024): 77–99.
- Kuypers, Jim A. “Ron DeSantis as Mainstream Radical.” Journal of Contemporary Rhetoric 13 (1) (2023): 30–38.
- Kuypers, Jim A. “The Destruction of Democracy: American Mainstream News Reportorial Practices Today.” Res Rhetorica 8 (3) (2021): 140–151.
- Kuypers, Jim A. “‘Scientific Rhetoric’: Kenneth Burke’s The War of Words and the Detection of the Conscious and Unconscious Biases of the Mainstream News Media.” The Kenneth Burke Journal 15 (1) (2021).
- Kuypers, Jim A.; and McDaniel, Caitlin. “The Inaugural Address of Donald J. Trump: Terministic Screens and the Reemergence of ‘Make America Great Again.’” The Kenneth Burke Journal 14 (1) (2019).
- Bakke, Peter; and Kuypers, Jim A. “The Syrian Civil War, International Outreach, and a Clash of Worldviews.” The Kenneth Burke Journal 11 (2) (2016).
- Goldman, Adria Y.; and Kuypers, Jim A. “Contrasts in News Coverage: A Qualitative Framing Analysis of ‘A’ List Bloggers and Newspaper Articles Reporting on the Jena 6.” Relevant Rhetoric 1 (1) (2010).
- Kuypers, Jim A.; Cooper, Stephen; and Althouse, Matthew. “The President and the Press: A Rhetorical Framing Analysis of George W. Bush’s Speech to the United Nations on November 10, 2001.” American Communication Journal 10 (3) (2008).
- Kuypers, Jim A.; and Cooper, Stephen. “A Comparative Framing Analysis of Embedded and Behind-the-Lines Reporting on the 2003 Iraq War.” Qualitative Research Reports in Communication 6 (1) (2005): 1–10.
- Kuypers, Jim A.; Young, Marilyn J.; and Launer, Michael K. “Composite Narrative, Authoritarian Discourse, and the Soviet Response to the Destruction of Iran Air Flight 655.” Quarterly Journal of Speech 87 (3) (2001): 305–320.
- Kuypers, Jim A. “From Science, Moral Poetics: Dr. James Dobson’s Response to the Fetal Tissue Research Initiative.” Quarterly Journal of Speech 86 (2) (2000): 146–167.
- Kuypers, Jim A. “Doxa and a Critical Rhetoric: Accounting for the Rhetorical Agent through Prudence.” Communication Quarterly 44 (4) (1996): 452–462.

== See also ==
- Media bias
- Media bias in the United States
- Rhetorical criticism
- War on terrorism
