= Enemy Territory =

Enemy Territory may refer to:

- Wolfenstein: Enemy Territory, a 2003 sequel to the video game Return to Castle Wolfenstein
- Enemy Territory: Quake Wars, a 2007 video game, part of the same franchise as above
- Enemy Territory (film), a 1987 action film, starring Gary Frank and Ray Parker Jr.
- Enemy Territory, a 2016 thriller movie, starring Adrien Brody
- Goodman Stadium
