= Metaphorical framing =

Type of framing

Metaphorical framing is a particular type of framing that attempts to influence decision-making by mapping characteristics of one concept in terms of another. The purpose of metaphorical framing is to convey an abstract or complex idea in easier-to-comprehend terms by mapping characteristics of an abstract or complex source onto characteristics of a simpler or concrete target. Metaphorical framing is based on George Lakoff and Mark Johnson's work on conceptual metaphors, which holds that human cognition is metaphorically conceptualized. Metaphorical framing has been used in political rhetoric to influence political decision-making.

== Origins of metaphorical framing ==
According to conceptual metaphor theory, people think in terms of frames that are physically realized in the neurocircuitry of the brain. For instance, when a metaphor frames a specific issue, say gas prices, using the basic metaphor more is up and less is down, people will think in terms of up and down when they hear the phrase "gas prices are going through the roof."

Conceptual metaphor theory relies on the fact that people learn metaphors in early development through a series of the repeated pairing of brain activity and instances in the environment. For example, a child learns the more is up metaphor when seeing liquid being poured in a container and sees that the liquid in the container rises as more liquid is added. A part in the brain for quantity and another for verticality are frequently activated together forming a circuit that combines both concepts. The circuit that joins the quality and vertical part of the brain is the metaphor, specifically, the more is up metaphor. The more the neurocircuitry loops between verticality and quantification, the more the metaphor more is up gets instantiated in the brain.

Other research also suggests that metaphors originate in the brain. Specifically, Boulenger, Shtyrov, and Pulvermuller (2012) and others found that metaphors depicting a physical activity ("she grasped the idea" or "kick the habit") are processed through the brain's motor cortex much faster than literal language. The connection between metaphor and brain activity emerges early on in the processing stages at one-quarter of a second. When influencing brain activity, metaphors also influence the extent to which people pay attention to objects. For instance, people are more likely to allocate more attention and fixate longer on visual scenes when they read a motion metaphor such as the road goes through the desert than when they read the road is in the desert. Thus, metaphors are quickly understood, to the point that they are processed much faster than literal language.

== How metaphors work ==
Metaphorical framing involves mapping characteristics of a source domain onto characteristics of a target domain. In other words, all the work of metaphorical framing is done through the mapping processing, where the intended concept (i.e., the target) is conceptualized in terms of another concept (i.e., the source). Therefore, people need to have some amount of prior knowledge about both the source and target domains for metaphorical framing to be successful. One example of how prior knowledge affects decision making is the use of sports metaphors. A research study found that the use of sports metaphors can lead people to think more about an issue and be more susceptible to metaphorical framing if they liked sports. People who did not enjoy sports were not persuaded by the sports metaphor. One way in which metaphorical framing can be used regardless of prior knowledge or lack thereof is to use metaphors that are embodied, such as using spatial and motion metaphors, and culturally common metaphors, such as war metaphors or viral metaphors. Perhaps equally as important to prior knowledge is the strength of a belief in the target. If crime is framed as a virus or a beast, the metaphor would be ineffective if people have strong beliefs about how society should handle crime.

Metaphors are not just in the brain but are also represented in the knowledge structures people have in their long-term memory. For metaphorical framing to be effective, metaphors need to activate mental representations and associations (i.e., knowledge structures) in working memory—that part of the mind that temporarily holds information. When people process a metaphor, they retrieve knowledge structures about the source and to the target. The metaphor itself helps people map the knowledge structure of the source onto the knowledge structure of the target. In other words, source and target thinking become one. Nevertheless, metaphorical framing requires that the knowledge structures people activate in working memory be structurally similar—have apparent mappings that facilitate the thinking of the source and target as one.

Metaphorical framing is more effective when the metaphor is introduced first before a text or speech. This is because introducing the metaphor firsts allows people to use the metaphorical framing to think about the information that would be coming next, particularly when the information is ambiguous. That is, metaphorical framing allows people to interpret ambiguous information in terms of the metaphor. Moreover, metaphorical framing is also more effective when the metaphor itself is generative. That is, metaphorical framing works better people can continue generating more mappings themselves after processing a metaphorical frame.

In sum, metaphorical framing is most effective when it is present early, when people have prior knowledge of the source and/or target, and when the metaphor can be extended in novel ways.

== Difference between metaphorical framing and other types of frames ==
Metaphorical framing is different than other framing methods. In analogical framing, the source and the target domains require that they be similar, such as using the structure of the Solar System to think of the structure of an atom. However, in metaphorical framing, the source and the target domains do not have to be related. Metaphorical framing is also different from loss vs gain frames. In this case, loss vs gain frames specifically frames concepts in terms of losses or as wins and not in metaphorical terms. Moreover, loss and gains frames stem from prospect theory which states that people weigh more heavily losses than equivalent frames. Metaphorical framing is also different from episodic and thematic framing. The latter emphasizes the scope of the problem, whether it is looked at through a personal lens (i.e., episodic) or in general terms (i.e., thematic), while the former emphasizes a figurative relation.

== Metaphorically framed issues ==
In a seminal study, researchers Thibodeau and Boroditsky (2011) conducted a series of studies in which they presented to participants two metaphorical frames of the crime rate of a fictitious city called Addison. One metaphorical frame depicted crime as either "wild beast preying" on the city, while the other metaphorical frame depicted Addison's crime rate as a "virus infecting" the city. The main hypothesis was whether the paper supported different approaches to solving Addison's crime. The researchers found that, on the one hand, participants who read the "crime is a beast" metaphor were more likely to support crime-fighting strategies such as increasing the number of police officers and building more jails. On the other hand, participants who read the "crime is a virus" metaphor were more likely to support crime-prevention strategies, such as implementing social reforms and calling for an investigation into the root causes of crime. A follow-up study demonstrated that participants were unaware of the influence of the metaphorical frame on their attitudes toward crime. Recent evidence suggests that this particular metaphor is not as effective when compared to a control group. Specifically, Steen, Reijnierse, and Burgers (2014) find that people tend to favor crime-fighting strategies irrespective of the frame they were presented. The researchers end their article with a call for more research to define the boundaries in which metaphorical framing effects can be effective.

Metaphorical framing has been shown to influence the way people think about ideas and who came up with them. Specifically, Elmore and Luna-Lucero (2017) manipulated the framing of an idea of an inventor as either the light bulb (e.g., "a bright idea" that " struck him" like "a light bulb that had suddenly turned on") or as a seed ("the seed of an idea" that "took root" like " a growing seed that had finally borne fruit"). The researchers found that framing ideas as the light bulb (vs. seed) led people to perceive the inventor as more of a genius and lead people to think of the inventor's idea itself as more exceptional. Researchers also tested whether there would be any differences if the inventor was female or male. They found that only in the seed metaphor condition did people perceive the female inventor as a genius. Conversely, the light bulb metaphor led people to perceive the male inventor as a genius.

Metaphorical frames are also used to frame political rhetoric, and consequently, also frame news media stories. For instance, Santa Ana (1999) analyzed the newspaper Los Angeles Times during their coverage of the 1994 political debate over California's anti-immigrant Proposition 187 that would have prevented undocumented Californians from using state services. Santa Ana found that in their coverage, the LA Times frequently framed immigrants as animals (e.g., "The truth is, employers, hungering for really cheap labor hunt out the foreign workers" and "Once the electorate's appetite has been whet with the red meat of deportation as a viable policy option"). Santa Ana argues that the "immigrants as animals" metaphor is inherently racist, and "while the Los Angeles Times news writers are not overtly racist, their continued use of the metaphor contributes to demeaning and dehumanizing the immigrant worker," (p. 217).

Research also shows that metaphorically framing immigration as a flood (e.g., a wave of refugees) can increase support for a wall at the US-Mexico border. In this example, researchers conducted a content analysis of social media posts (i.e., tweets) and also experimentally exposed people to a frame describing immigration in terms of a flood or a control group. The content analysis revealed that people who support building a wall to prevent immigrants from migrating to the U.S. were more likely to frame immigration as a flood than people who do not support the wall. That is, the flood metaphor concerning immigration was present in natural everyday language. In the experiment, researchers found that people who were exposed to the flood metaphor about immigration (e.g., "illegal immigrants flood into our nation and drown out the native population") were more likely to afterward express support for the border wall than people who read literal language about immigration (e.g., "illegal immigrants come into our nation and displace the native population"). In this example, the flood wording activates in people's minds associations of flood-prevention strategies, such as a levee. People then use the heightened mental association of flood-levee to think about immigration as refugee-wall—thus espousing greater support for a border wall.

One type of metaphorical framing that is widely used in politics is framing a concept in terms of a war. For instance, a research study investigated if framing the issue of climate change as a war or as race would lead to a greater sense of urgency, a heighten sense of risk, and a greater likelihood of engaging in conservational behaviors. In this study, researchers exposed participants to three conditions of a news article describing climate change. In one condition, participants read climate change framed as a war (e.g., "the entire country should be recruited to fight this deadly battle"). In the second condition, participants read about climate change described as a race (e.g., "the United States is joining the race to reduce its carbon footprint in the new few decades"). Results from this study show that people are more likely to engage in conservational behaviors, have a heightened sense of risk about climate change, and have a greater sense of urgency.

== See also ==
- Framing
- Framing effects (psychology)
- Metaphor
- Political metaphors
