= EcoAmerica =

American nonprofit organization

ecoAmerica
- Founded: 2005
- Founder: Robert (Bob) Perkowitz
- Type: Non-profit organization
- Purpose: Building institutional leadership, public support, and political resolve for climate solutions in the united states.
- Location(s): Washington, D.C., and San Francisco, California
- Region served: United States
- Website: ecoamerica.org

EcoAmerica is a national, 501(c)(3) non-profit organization based in Washington, D.C., and San Francisco, California. The organization and its programs seek to build institutional leadership, public support, and political resolve for climate solutions in the United States. The organization uses research-driven marketing, partnerships, and national programs.

== Programs ==
Climate for Health is one of ecoAmerica's national programs that seeks to engage the health sector for climate solutions. Partnerships include the American Public Health Association, the American Academy of Pediatrics, the Society for Public Health Education, the Harvard T.H. Chan School of Public Health, the National Association of Community Health Centers, the National Network of Public Health Institutes, the Alliance of Nurses for Healthy Environments, Physicians for Social Responsibility, the National League for Nursing, the National Association of County and City Health Officials, and more. In November 2021, Climate for Health published one of their "Let’s Talk Climate" webcast episodes that focused on the impacts of climate change on human reproduction and the urgent need to move society toward just and equitable climate solutions.

Blessed Tomorrow is another national program that seeks to engage the faith sector for climate solutions. Blessed Tomorrow's partners span across multiple faith communities and denominations. Some of the most prominent partnerships include those with Presbyterian Church (USA), the Islamic Society of North America, American Baptist Churches USA, United Church of Christ, The United Methodist Church, the Evangelical Lutheran Church in America (ELCA), and Disciples Home Missions. In 2020, the Blessed Tomorrow program partnered with Unety to bring technical and financial resources to different faith traditions across the United States with the goal of saving energy costs, reducing carbon emissions, and enhancing cash flows. In November 2022, the Blessed Tomorrow program convened 16 US denominational leaders in a roundtable event to collaborate on climate action. Next steps for a national faith and climate campaign began on February 16, 2023, at the National Faith and Climate Forum in Washington, D.C.

Path to Positive communities is a national program that seeks to engage local communities for climate solutions. In 2017, ecoAmerica teamed up with Utah Clean Energy and kicked off Path to Positive Utah: an initiative to create conversations about climate change.

ecoAmerica's climate ambassador training program focuses on equipping people with the resources and knowledge necessary to act and speak on climate change and climate solutions. Following completion of training, ambassadors are encouraged to find ways to advocate for climate solutions.

== Events ==
ecoAmerica's American Climate Leadership Summit (ACLS) brings climate leaders across diverse sectors together speak on climate change and climate solutions. In 2017, the American Climate Leadership Summit was hosted in Washington, D.C., and brought together 350 leaders from around the country. In 2021, with the presence of the COVID-19 pandemic, ecoAmerica hosted their American Climate Leadership Summit online.

ecoAmerica's American Climate Leadership Awards (ACLA) is an event in which individuals and organizations taking actions toward climate solutions can apply or be nominated for an opportunity to win a share of $175,000 in cash awards.

== Research and Reports ==
Mental Health and Our Changing Climate is a report by the American Psychological Association and ecoAmerica. The report explains how climate change is detrimental to people's mental health. Overall, the report covers the impacts that climate change has on mental health, ways to build resilience amid a changing climate, and actions people can take to protect mental health. The original report was published in 2017 and was later updated in 2021.

The American Climate Perspectives Survey (ACPS) is a survey created and administered by ecoAmerica to collect data and information from American adult respondents representing the American population and their perspectives on questions and topics related to climate change. The results from this research are circulated and used to inform program operations or further research. Much of ecoAmerica's research is focused on climate communications. For instance, in 2014, ecoAmerica partnered with Columbia University's Center for Research on Environmental Decisions and produced the report, "Connecting on Climate: A Guide to Effective Climate Change Communication". Another report, recognized by Yale Climate Connections, was published in collaboration with the American Psychological Association and the American Public Health Association titled, "Climate Changes Mental Health".

== Advocacy in legislation ==
ecoAmerica was among the organizations supporting the Community Wellness & Resilience Act introduced by Representatives Paul D. Tonko and Brian Fitzpatrick. The bill addressed natural disasters’ traumatic impacts on community mental health and wellness.

Biden administration officials recognized ecoAmerica at COP27 as a signatory of the White House/HHS Health Sector Climate Pledge. The pledge was centered on setting and meeting targets for emissions reduction and climate resilience.
