= Shane Frederick =

American academic

Shane Frederick is a tenured professor at the Yale School of Management. He earlier worked at Massachusetts Institute of Technology. He is the creator of the cognitive reflection test, which has been found to be "predictive of the types of choices that feature prominently in tests of decision-making theories, like expected utility theory and prospect theory. People who score high on the CRT are less vulnerable to various biases, and show more patience in intertemporal choice tasks.

His specialties are decision-making and intertemporal choice, time preferences and discount functions, and has authored papers with, among others, George Loewenstein of Carnegie Mellon University and Nobel laureate Daniel Kahneman, emeritus of Princeton University.

Frederick was born in Park Falls, Wisconsin, and graduated from the University of Wisconsin with a B.A. in zoology, from Simon Fraser University with an M.S. in Resource Management, and from Carnegie Mellon University with a Ph.D. in Decision Sciences.

== Selected publications ==
- Representativeness revisited: Attribute substitution in intuitive judgment (with D. Kahneman)
- Time discounting and time preference: a critical review (with T. O'Donoghue)
