= Social discount rate =

Rate used for discounting future benefits or costs to society

Social discount rate (SDR) is the discount rate used in computing the value of funds spent on social projects. Discount rates are used to put a present value on costs and benefits that will occur at a later date. Determining this rate is not always easy and can be the subject of discrepancies in the true net benefit to certain projects, plans and policies. The discount rate is considered as a critical element in cost–benefit analysis when the costs and the benefits differ in their distribution over time, this usually occurs when the project that is being studied is over a long period of time.

== Use in cost–benefit analysis ==
It may be used in estimating the value of creating a highway system, schools, or enforcing environmental protection, for example. All of these things require a cost–benefit analysis where policy makers measure the social marginal cost and the social marginal benefit for each project. Almost all new policies will not even be considered until after a cost–benefit analysis has been completed. The social discount rate can appear in both calculations either as future costs such as maintenance or as future benefits such as reduced pollution emissions.

Calculating the true social marginal cost can be a lot easier than measuring the social marginal benefit. Because of the uncertainty involved with calculating benefits, problems may arise e.g., should a dollar amount be put on time based on average wages, contingent valuations or revealed preferences? One of the big problems today is putting a value on a life. While some might say that a life is priceless, economists usually state the value to be somewhere between three and ten million dollars. Another problem is that because the current generation will often be paying for most of the costs while future generations will be reaping most of the benefit, whether current and future benefits ought to be weighed differently.

The proper discount rate should represent the opportunity cost of what else the firm could accomplish with those same funds. If that means that the money could be instead used to invest in the private sector that would yield 5% and that is the next best alternative for using that money then 5% would be the social discount rate

The US government uses a variety of discount rates but something around 7% is what the US Office of Management and Budget (OMB) recommends for a pretax rate of return on private investments. In the United Kingdom, HM Treasury fixes the social discount rate for the public sector at 3.5%.

== Calculation ==
The SDR is directly analogous to concepts found in corporate finance such as the hurdle rate or the project appropriate discount rate; so the mathematics are identical. The benefit or cost per dollar can be calculated by:

$$\ (1/(1+r)^t)$$

where r equals the SDR and t equals time. For benefits or costs that have no end and discount starting tomorrow it is just:

$$\ (1/r)$$

where discounting starts at t=0 it is:

$$\ (1+1/r)$$

A higher SDR makes it less likely a social project will be funded. A higher SDR implies greater risks to the assumption that the benefits of the project will be reaped. A small increase in the social discount rate can matter enormously for benefits far into the future so it is very important to be as accurate as possible when choosing which rate to use.

Frank Ramsey's social discount rate is calculated as follows:

$$r = d + ng$$,

where $d$ is time preference, $n$ is the elasticity of marginal utility of consumption and $g$ is the growth rate.

There is a strong case for factoring in the equity issue when discounting benefits and costs of intergenerational projects such as those designed to combat climate change and environmental degradation.

The social discount rate is a reflection of a society's relative valuation on today's well-being versus well-being in the future. The appropriate selection of a social discount rate is crucial for cost–benefit analysis, and has important implications for resource allocations. There is wide diversity in social discount rates, with developed nations typically applying a lower rate (3–7%) than developing nations (8–15%).

The subject of a social discount rate, always a source of fierce debate between economists, has become highly controversial since the publication of the Stern Review on the Economics of Climate Change. The publication exploded on the global warming scene in 2006 with its dire warning that global gross domestic product (GDP) was at future risk of a 20% reduction if there was a failure to invest 1% of world GDP now to reduce global warming. The Review did not use a single discount rate, but applied a stochastic approach whereby the discount rate varied with the expected outcomes, reflecting the interaction between growth and the elasticity of marginal utility, in line with Frank Ramsey's growth model. However, critics questioned the findings on the basis that they were partly obtained using an extremely low pure time preference rate of 0.1% in economic modeling.

There is no consensus among economists and, according to the survey, no "one-size-fits-all" solution to the choice of social discount rate, owing to national variations. A regular reassessment and readjustment of the social discount rate used by each country is therefore required.

== Differences between private and social ==
There are a number of qualitative differences between social and corporate discount rates and evaluation of projects associated with them. The governance of social project funding is different naturally, because estimating the benefits of social projects requires making ethically subtle choices about the benefits to others. For example, if it was presumed that a meteor will wipe out all life in a few years the SDR after the event is infinitely high. Alternately if we presume that the population will have many new and wonderful choices capturing benefits (i.e. they will be more wealthy) in the future that too raises the SDR of creating any given benefit. For example, choices about the SDR of environmental protection projects, such as funding the reduction of global warming, place a greater valuation on future generations.

== Contributors to social discount rate ==
As with private discount rates, social discount rates can attempt to incorporate several factors (however, some factors may overlap or be inapplicable in a given analysis). One factor is a common expectation of increased wealth in the future, in which case a dollar received now, in the midst of relative poverty, has more utility than a dollar received later, in the midst of relative wealth. (This factor may not apply to non-monetary rewards, for example, measuring lives saved now versus lives saved later.) Similarly, economists refer to a "time value of money": a dollar received now might grant the recipient the option to either use the dollar now or to invest it (gaining interest) and use it next year, whereas a dollar received next year can only be used next year (and without the intervening interest). A third factor is that a proposed project may fail or become moot due to changing circumstances; if a fixed annual percentage chance of such failure can be approximated, that risk can be rolled into the total discount rate. A fourth factor is pragmatics: people seem to discount the future anyway, so the theory might as well incorporate a uniform compromise to express the desired trade-off between present and future welfare.

=== "Pure time preference" debates ===
The pragmatic factor usually results in a "pure time preference" factor in the social discount rate, that a pleasurable experience at a certain date is intrinsically more valuable than the exact same experience at a later date, and that the life of a person born sooner has more intrinsic value than the life of a person born later. According to philosopher Toby Ord, while this is common practice in the economics community, most philosophers consider a "pure time preference" to lack intrinsic moral justification. Frank Ramsey, himself, labeled it "ethically indefensible". Ord also argues that, given the long and unfortunate human history of discounting the welfare of outgroups, the burden should be on those proposing a pure time preference to establish its necessity. Intuitively, it seems odd that the welfare of an 80-year-old born in 1970 is intrinsically superior to the welfare of an 80-year-old born in 1980; in the context of social (rather than private) discount rates, when asked for their preferences over the welfare of others, most peoples' apparent "pure time preferences" becomes smaller or even disappears. Philosopher Derek Parfit states "No one suggests that... we should adopt a Spatial Discount Rate. No one thinks that we would be morally justified if we cared less about the long-range effects of our acts, at some rate n percent per yard. The Temporal Discount Rate is, I believe, as little justified." In contrast, Andreas Mogensen argues that a positive rate of pure time preference can be justified on the basis of kinship. That is, common-sense morality allows us to be partial to those more closely related to us, so "we can permissibly weight the welfare of each succeeding generation less than that of the generation preceding it."

When considering longer time periods, a fixed "pure time preference" discount rate becomes extremely counterintuitive; a 1% rate implies that Tutankhamun should ethically value a single day of his life over the sum total entire lives of everyone living today. Over long periods, peoples' stated preferences become extremely hyperbolic. Critics worry that valuing the individual welfare of future generations can, if taken to an extreme, lead to a problematic 'Pascal's mugging' conclusion that current welfare has relatively negligible value.

==== In global climate change ====
This topic has recently been very controversial and highly debated. Since there is such a strong probability that the world will suffer significantly in the future due to global change in temperature, finding the correct social discount rate for the benefits of reducing CO_{2} emissions and other harmful greenhouse gases is very important. In 2005, a New York Times article written by Hal Varian states:

The choice of an appropriate social time discount rate has long been debated. Some very intelligent people have argued that giving future generations less weight than the current generation is "ethically indefensible." Other equally intelligent people have argued that weighting generations equally leads to paradoxical and even nonsensical results.

The range in the social discount rate for a cost–benefit analysis in this issue range from zero to over 3%. Some argue that the only reason for discriminating against future generations is that these generations might cease to exist in the future. Thus the rate of time preference should equal zero since the probability for such a catastrophic event is so low (assumed to be 0.1% per year). This infers that there is equal weight given to all generations. However, to the extent that future generations are likely to be richer than those in the present, a positive discount rate should be applied reflecting the diminishing marginal utility of consumption. The Stern Review on the Economics of Climate Change is one such report that argues for zero discrimination of future generations, but applied a range of positive discount rates to its assessment based on the range of consumption projections predicted by climate models at the time. There is an important distinction here between discounting, which is partly a function of expected future consumption paths, and pure time preference, which is the rate of discrimination through time. A common misconception is that the Stern Review applied a zero discount rate. In fact, the Stern review's stochastic projections applied many discount rates reflecting a range of consumption projections, all of them positive, even while it took the rate of time preference to be close to zero. This confusion is prevalent. William D. Nordhaus of Yale

examines a model of climate change that is similar to the one used in the Stern Review but with a 3 percent social discount rate that slowly declines to 1 percent in 300 years rather than the 0.1 percent discount rate used in the Stern Review. In his model, the welfare of future generations is given less weight than the current generation's welfare. He finds that preventive measures like a tax on carbon emissions are certainly required. But they are of a much smaller magnitude than those recommended in the [Stern] report.

The Stern Review did not apply a 0.1 percent discount rate, but it did apply a near-zero rate of time preference.

== See also ==
- Public policy
- Engineering economics (civil engineering)
- Financial analysis
- Kaldor–Hicks efficiency
- Longtermism
- Risk–benefit ratio
- Ramsey growth model
