= Discounted utility =

Utility of a future event as perceived now versus when it occurs

In economics, discounted utility is the utility (desirability) of some future event, such as consuming a certain amount of a good, as perceived at the present time as opposed to at the time of its occurrence. It is calculated as the present discounted value of future utility, and for people with time preference for sooner rather than later gratification, it is less than the future utility. The utility of an event x occurring at future time t under utility function u, discounted back to the present (time 0) using discount factor β, is

$\beta ^t u(x_t).$

Since more distant events are less liked, 0 < β < 1.

Discounted utility calculations made for events at various points in the future as well as at the present take the form

$\sum_{t=0}^T \beta ^t u(x_t),$

where u(x_{t}) is the utility of some choice x at time t and T is the time of the most distant future satisfaction event. Here, since utility comparisons are being made across time when the utilities are combined in a single evaluation, the utility function is necessarily cardinal in nature.

In a typical intertemporal consumption model, the above summation of utilities discounted from various future times would be maximized with respect to the amounts x_{t} consumed in each period, subject to an intertemporal budget constraint that says that the present value of current and future expenditures does not exceed the present value of financial resources available for spending.

The interpretation of β is not straightforward. Sometimes it is explained as the degree of a person's patience. Given the interpretation of economic agents as rational, this exempts time-valuations from rationality judgments, so that someone who spends and borrows voraciously is just as rational as someone who spends and saves moderately, or as someone who hoards his wealth and never spends it: different people have different rates of time preference.

Some formulations treat β not as a constant, but as a function β(t) that itself varies over time, for example in models which use the concept of hyperbolic discounting. This view is consistent with empirical observations that humans display inconsistent time preferences. For example, experiments by Tversky and Kahneman showed that the same people who would choose 1 candy bar now over 2 candy bars tomorrow, would choose 2 candy bars 101 days from now over 1 candy bar 100 days from now. (This is inconsistent because if the same question were posed 100 days from now, the person would ostensibly again choose 1 candy bar immediately instead of 2 candy bars the next day.)

Despite arguments about how β should be interpreted, the basic idea is that all other things equal, the agent prefers to have something now as opposed to later (hence β < 1).

== See also ==
- Discount function
- Intertemporal choice
- Temporal discounting
