= Intertemporal budget constraint =

Faced by a decision-maker considering present, future

In economics and finance, an intertemporal budget constraint is a constraint faced by a decision maker who is making choices for both the present and the future. The term intertemporal is used to describe any relationship between past, present and future events or conditions. In its general form, the intertemporal budget constraint says that the present value of current and future cash outflows cannot exceed the present value of currently available funds and future cash inflows. Typically this is expressed as

$$\sum_{t=0}^T \frac{x_t}{(1+r)^t}  \le \sum_{t=0}^T \frac{w_t}{(1+r)^t} ,$$

where $x_t$ is expenditure at time t, $w_t$ is the cash that becomes available at time t, T is the most distant relevant time period, 0 is the current period, and $\frac{1}{1+r}$ is the discount factor computed from the interest rate r.

Complications are possible in various circumstances. For example, the interest rate for discounting cash receipts might be greater than the interest rate for discounting expenditures, because future inflows may be borrowed against while currently available funds may be invested temporarily pending use for future expenditures, and borrowing rates may exceed investment returns.

== Applications ==
In most applications, the entire budget would be used up, because any unspent funds would represent unobtained potential utility. In these situations, the intertemporal budget constraint is effectively an equality constraint.

In an intertemporal consumption model, the sum of utilities from expenditures made at various times in the future, these utilities discounted back to the present at the consumer's rate of time preference, would be maximized with respect to the amounts x_{t} consumed in each period, subject to an intertemporal budget constraint.

In a model of intertemporal portfolio choice, the objective would be to maximize the expected value or expected utility of final period wealth. Since investment returns in each period generally would not be known in advance, the constraint effectively imposes a limit on the amount that can be invested in the final period—namely, whatever the wealth accumulated as of the end of the next-to-last period is.

== See also ==
- Intertemporal choice
