= Prelec =

Prelec is a Croatian and Slovenian surname. Notable people with the surname include:

- Drazen Prelec (born 1955), American professor of management science and economics
- Ivan Prelec (born 1987), Croatian football manager
