= Marc Oliver Rieger =

- Born: September 22, 1974 (age 50); Germany
- Education: Max Planck Institute for Mathematics in the Sciences
- Occupation(s): Mathematician and finance academic

Marc Oliver Rieger (born September 22, 1974) is a German mathematician and finance professor. His research covers the areas of behavioural finance, decision and game theory, financial derivatives, and calculus of variation.

Together with Thorsten Hens and Mei Wang, he was one of the authors of the INTRA survey (International Test on Risk Attitudes) that collected risk and time preferences in 53 countries worldwide leading to various follow-up studies by other researchers and practitioners and media coverage by leading newspapers in Germany and elsewhere.

== Biography ==
Rieger is Professor of Banking and Finance at the University of Trier, Germany, since 2010, and Director of the Confucius Institute of the University of Trier since 2018. In 2018, he was also adjunct professor at National Chengchi University, Taipei, Taiwan and in 2019 guest professor at the University of Zurich. Since 2019, he is core member of the research group "Quantitative Finance and Risk Analysis", and project leader of the research cluster "Globalization and Re-Nationalization," both financed by the research initiative of the state of Rheinland-Pfalz.

Rieger studied mathematics at University of Konstanz from 1993 to 1998, and obtained a PhD at Max Planck Institute for Mathematics in the Sciences, Leipzig, in 2001, under the supervision of Stefan Müller. He worked as research scholar and postdoc at Carnegie Mellon University, Scuola Normale Superiore, University of Zürich and ETH Zürich.

== Selected publications ==
=== INTRA survey ===
- Wolfgang Breuer, Marc Oliver Rieger, & K. Can Soypak (2014) The behavioral foundations of corporate dividend policy a cross-country analysis. Journal of Banking and Finance, 42, 247-265
- Marc Oliver Rieger, Mei Wang, & Thorsten Hens (2015) Risk preferences around the world. Management Science, 61(3), 637-648
- Mei Wang, Marc O. Rieger, & Thorsten Hens (2016) How time preferences differ: Evidence from 53 countries. Journal of Economic Psychology, 52, 115-135
- Marc Oliver Rieger, Mei Wang, & Thorsten Hens (2016) Estimating cumulative prospect theory parameters from an international survey. Theory and Decision, 17, 1-30.

=== Books ===
- Financial Economics: A concise Introduction to Classical and Behavioural Finance by Thorsten Hens and Marc O Rieger, Springer Verlag, Heidelberg, Deutschland, 2nd edition (2016). ISBN 978-3-662-49688-6
- Cultural Finance by Thorsten Hens, Marc Oliver Rieger, and Mei Wang, World Scientific. ISBN 978-981-121-976-4

=== Other topics ===
- Marc Oliver Rieger & Mei Wang (2006) Cumulative Prospect Theory and the St. Petersburg Paradox. Economic Theory, 28, 665-679
- Marc Oliver Rieger, Enrico De Giorgi, & Thorsten Hens (2010) Financial Market Equilibria with Cumulative Prospect Theory, Journal of Mathematical Economics, 46(5), 633-651
- Marc Oliver Rieger (2011) Co-monotonicity of optimal investments and the design of structural financial products, Finance and Stochastics, 15(1), 27-55
- Marc Oliver Rieger (2014) Evolutionary stability of prospect theory preferences, Journal of Mathematical Economics, 50, 1-11.
