= Thorsten Hens =

German economist and finance academic (born 1961)

- Born: December 19, 1961 (age 64)
- Citizenship: Swiss and German

Academic background
- Education: University of Bonn

Academic work
- Discipline: Financial economics Behavioral finance Evolutionary finance
- Institutions: University of Zurich; Norwegian School of Economics

Thorsten Hens (born December 19, 1961) is a Swiss-German economist and professor of financial economics at the University of Zurich. His research focuses on behavioral finance, evolutionary finance and sustainable finance. He is also an adjunct professor at the Norwegian School of Economics. Hens was ranked among the top ten economics professors in Germany, Austria and Switzerland by Handelsblatt.

== Education ==
Hens studied at the University of Bonn, where he completed a preliminary diploma in computer science in 1984 and a diploma in economics in 1988. He earned his doctorate in 1992 through the European Doctoral Programme and completed his habilitation at Bonn in 1996.

== Career ==
Hens began his academic career at the University of Bonn, working as a research assistant and lecturer from 1988 to 1992 and subsequently holding a postdoctoral appointment in Werner Hildenbrand's economics department until 1996. During this period, he spent 1993 as a visiting scholar at Stanford University. He then taught economic theory as a professor at Bielefeld University from 1996 to 1999.

In 1999, Hens joined the University of Zurich's Institute for Empirical Research in Economics as professor of financial markets and monetary macroeconomics, becoming professor of financial economics in 2006. Alongside his work in Zurich, he held adjunct appointments at the Norwegian School of Economics, beginning in 2001, and at the University of Lucerne from 2016 to 2026.

At Zurich, Hens's administrative responsibilities have included serving as vice-dean of the Faculty of Economics, Informatics and Business Administration from 2001 to 2008, head of the Department of Banking and Finance from 2009 to 2016, and vice-director of the Department of Finance from 2020 to 2025. He has also headed the university's Center for Portfolio Management.

Hens has been involved in collaborative research initiatives within and beyond the university. From 2001 to 2013, he coordinated the Swiss research network NCCR FINRISK and directed its behavioral finance project. He also led the Zurich branch of the Swiss Finance Institute from 2007 to 2009. He co-founded the UZH Blockchain Center and Fintech Center and was a founding partner of Behavioral Finance Solutions, a spin-off of the universities of Zurich and St. Gallen.

His editorial work has included advisory editorship of the Journal of Mathematical Economics and associate editorships of the Journal of Banking & Finance and Mathematics and Financial Economics. He also serves on the editorial board of Digital Finance.

== Research ==
Hens's research examines financial markets and investment decisions using economic theory, psychology and evolutionary models informed by biology. His research areas include evolutionary finance, behavioral finance and cultural finance. His work on general equilibrium theory addresses incomplete markets, financial intermediation and the existence and stability of market equilibria.

In evolutionary finance, Hens has studied the survival of investment strategies and the stability of portfolio rules. His work with collaborators including Igor Evstigneev and Klaus Reiner Schenk-Hoppé examines competition among investment strategies and the evolution of investors' wealth. Their publications address market selection, portfolio allocation and financial market models incorporating risk-free assets, short selling and endogenous asset supply.

His behavioral finance research concerns risk aversion, loss aversion, time preference and the application of prospect theory to investment decisions. With Marc Oliver Rieger and Mei Wang, he conducted the International Test on Risk Attitudes (INTRA), examining differences in risk and time preferences across countries. Other collaborative work examines financial advice, retirement decisions and the use of simulated investment experience to communicate risk. His consulting work applies behavioral finance to private banking and evolutionary finance to asset management.

His research also addresses sustainable investing, including its treatment within the capital asset pricing model, and applications of artificial intelligence in finance, including the use of large language models for investor risk profiling.

Hens has also participated in the Swiss National Science Foundation Sinergia project "The Foundations of Successful Financial Decision Making", which investigates individual differences in financial decisions.

== Awards and honors ==
In 1992, Hens received the GEFFRUB Society's prize for the best doctoral dissertation at the University of Bonn. He received the 2016 ZKB Best Paper Award from the Swiss Society for Financial Market Research, jointly with Kremena Bachmann. In the same year, he received the CUREM Teaching Award from the Center for Urban and Real Estate Management at the University of Zurich. In 2025, he was elected a Fellow of the Society for the Advancement of Economic Theory.

== Books ==
- With Beate Pilgrim. General Equilibrium Foundations of Finance. Kluwer Academic Publishers, 2003. ISBN 978-1-4020-7337-3.
- With Carlo Strub. Grundzüge der analytischen Makroökonomie. Springer, 2004. ISBN 3-540-20082-7.
- With Paolo Pamini. Grundzüge der analytischen Mikroökonomie. Springer, 2008. ISBN 978-3-540-28157-3.
- Edited with Klaus Reiner Schenk-Hoppé. Handbook of Financial Markets: Dynamics and Evolution. North-Holland, 2009. ISBN 978-0-12-374258-2.
- With Igor V. Evstigneev and Klaus Reiner Schenk-Hoppé. Mathematical Financial Economics: A Basic Introduction. Springer, 2015. ISBN 978-3-319-16570-7.
- With Marc Oliver Rieger. Financial Economics: A Concise Introduction to Classical and Behavioral Finance. 2nd edition. Springer, 2016. ISBN 978-3-662-49686-2.
- With Enrico De Giorgi and Kremena Bachmann. Behavioral Finance for Private Banking. 2nd edition. Wiley, 2018. ISBN 978-1-119-45370-3.
- With Sabine Elmiger. Economic Foundations for Finance: From Main Street to Wall Street. Springer, 2019. ISBN 978-3-030-05425-0.
- With Marc Oliver Rieger. Solutions to Financial Economics: Exercises on Classical and Behavioral Finance. Springer, 2019. ISBN 978-3-662-59887-0.
- With Marc Oliver Rieger and Mei Wang. Cultural Finance: A World Map of Risk, Time and Money. World Scientific, 2020. ISBN 978-981-1219-76-4.

== Other selected publications ==
- Evstigneev, I. V., Hens, T. and Schenk-Hoppé, K. R. (2002), MARKET SELECTION OF FINANCIAL TRADING STRATEGIES: GLOBAL STABILITY. Mathematical Finance, 12: 329–339.
- Rieger, M. Wang, M. and Hens, T.: Risk Preferences Around the World, Management Science 2015, 61:3, 637-648
