= Dynamic inconsistency =

When a decision-maker's future preferences can contradict earlier preferences

In economics, dynamic inconsistency or time inconsistency is a situation in which a decision-maker's preferences change over time in such a way that a preference can become inconsistent at another point in time. This can be thought of as there being many different "selves" within decision makers, with each "self" representing the decision-maker at a different point in time; the inconsistency occurs when not all preferences are aligned.

The term "dynamic inconsistency" is more closely affiliated with game theory, whereas "time inconsistency" is more closely affiliated with behavioral economics.

== In game theory ==
In the context of game theory, dynamic inconsistency is a situation in a dynamic game where a player's best plan for some future period will not be optimal when that future period arrives. A dynamically inconsistent game is subgame imperfect. In this context, the inconsistency is primarily about commitment and credible threats. This manifests itself through a violation of Bellman's Principle of Optimality by the leader or dominant player, as shown in Simaan and Cruz (1973a, 1973b).

For example, a firm might want to commit itself to dramatically dropping the price of a product it sells if a rival firm enters its market. If this threat were credible, it would discourage the rival from entering. However, the firm might not be able to commit its future self to taking such an action because if the rival does in fact end up entering, the firm's future self might determine that, given the fact that the rival is now actually in the market and there is no point in trying to discourage entry, it is now not in its interest to dramatically drop the price. As such, the threat would not be credible. The present self of the firm has preferences that would have the future self be committed to the threat, but the future self has preferences that have it not carry out the threat. Hence, the dynamic inconsistency.

== In behavioral economics ==
In the context of behavioral economics, time inconsistency is related to how each different self of a decision-maker may have different preferences over current and future choices.

Consider, for example, the following question:

- (a) Which do you prefer, to be given 500 dollars today or 505 dollars tomorrow?
- (b) Which do you prefer, to be given 500 dollars 365 days from now or 505 dollars 366 days from now?

When this question is asked, to be time-consistent, one must make the same choice for (b) as for (a). According to George Loewenstein and Drazen Prelec, however, people are not always consistent. People tend to choose "500 dollars today" and "505 dollars 366 days later", which is different from the time-consistent answer.

One common way in which selves may differ in their preferences is they may be modeled as all holding the view that "now" has especially high value compared to any future time. This is sometimes called the "immediacy effect" or "temporal discounting". As a result, the present self will care too much about itself and not enough about its future selves. The self control literature relies heavily on this type of time inconsistency, and it relates to a variety of topics including procrastination, addiction, efforts at weight loss, and saving for retirement.

Time inconsistency basically means that there is disagreement between a decision-maker's different selves about what actions should be taken. Formally, consider an economic model with different mathematical weightings placed on the utilities of each self. Consider the possibility that for any given self, the weightings that self places on all the utilities could differ from the weightings that another given self places on all the utilities. The important consideration now is the relative weighting between two particular utilities. Will this relative weighting be the same for one given self as it is for a different given self? If it is, then we have a case of time consistency. If the relative weightings of all pairs of utilities are all the same for all given selves, then the decision-maker has time-consistent preferences. If there exists a case of one relative weighting of utilities where one self has a different relative weighting of those utilities than another self has, then we have a case of time inconsistency and the decision-maker will be said to have time-inconsistent preferences.

It is common in economic models that involve decision-making over time to assume that decision-makers are exponential discounters. Exponential discounting posits that the decision maker assigns future utility of any good according to the formula

$$U(t) = U(0) e^{-\rho t}$$

where $t=0$ is the present, $U(0)$ is the utility assigned to the good if it were consumed immediately, and $\rho$ is the "discount factor", which is the same for all goods and constant over time. Mathematically, it is the unique continuous function that satisfies the equation

$$U(t_1)/U(t_2) = U(t_1+c)/U(t_2+c);$$

that is, the ratio of utility values for a good at two different moments of time only depends on the interval between these times, but not on their choice. (If you're willing to pay 10% over list price to buy a new phone today instead of paying list price and having it delivered in a week, you'd also be willing to pay extra 10% to get it one week sooner if you were ordering it six months in advance.)

If $\rho$ is the same for all goods, then it is also the case that

$$U_A(t_1)/U_B(t_1) = U_A(t_2)/U_B(t_2);$$

that is, if good A is assigned higher utility than good B at time $t_1$, that relationship also holds at all other times. (If you'd rather eat broccoli than cake tomorrow for lunch, you'll also pick broccoli over cake if you're hungry right now.)

Exponential discounting yields time-consistent preferences. Exponential discounting and, more generally, time-consistent preferences are often assumed in rational choice theory, since they imply that all of a decision-maker's selves will agree with the choices made by each self. Any decision that the individual makes for himself in advance will remain valid (i.e., an optimal choice) as time advances, unless utilities themselves change.

However, empirical research makes a strong case that time inconsistency is, in fact, standard in human preferences. This would imply disagreement by people's different selves on decisions made and a rejection of the time consistency aspect of rational choice theory.

For example, consider having the choice between getting the day off work tomorrow or getting a day and a half off work one month from now. Suppose you would choose one day off tomorrow. Now suppose that you were asked to make that same choice ten years ago. That is, you were asked then whether you would prefer getting one day off in ten years or getting one and a half days off in ten years and one month. Suppose that then you would have taken the day and a half off. This would be a case of time inconsistency because your relative preferences for tomorrow versus one month from now would be different at two different points in time—namely now versus ten years ago. The decision made ten years ago indicates a preference for delayed gratification, but the decision made just before the fact indicates a preference for immediate pleasure.

More generally, humans have a systematic tendency to switch towards "vices" (products or activities which are pleasant in the short term) from "virtues" (products or activities which are seen as valuable in the long term) as the moment of consumption approaches, even if this involves changing decisions made in advance.

One way that time-inconsistent preferences have been formally introduced into economic models is by first giving the decision-maker standard exponentially discounted preferences, and then adding another term that heavily discounts any time that is not now. Preferences of this sort have been called "present-biased preferences". The hyperbolic discounting model is another commonly used model that allows one to obtain more realistic results with regard to human decision-making.

A different form of dynamic inconsistency arises as a consequence of "projection bias" (not to be confused with a defense mechanism of the same name). Humans have a tendency to mispredict their future marginal utilities by assuming that they will remain at present levels. This leads to inconsistency as marginal utilities (for example, tastes) change over time in a way that the individual did not expect. For example, when individuals are asked to choose between a piece of fruit and an unhealthy snack (such as a candy bar) for a future meal, the choice is strongly affected by their "current" level of hunger. Individuals may become addicted to smoking or drugs because they underestimate future marginal utilities of these habits (such as craving for cigarettes) once they become addicted.

== In media studies ==
Theories of media choice have not explicitly dealt with choice inconsistency as it was defined by behavioral economics. However, an article by Gui et al. (2021) draws on behavioral economics literature to address blind spots in theorization of inconsistent media selection in media studies. It also highlights that inconsistent choice is even more frequent and relevant in the digital environment, as higher stimulation and multitasking makes it easier to opt for immediate gratification even in the presence of different long-term preferences.

== Stylized examples ==
- In a game theory context, an announced government policy of never negotiating with terrorists over the release of hostages constitutes a time inconsistency example, since in each particular hostage situation the authorities face the dilemma of breaking the rule and trying to save the hostages. Assuming the government acted consistently in not ever breaking the rule, it would make it irrational for a terrorist group to take hostages. (Of course, in the real world terrorists might not act rationally.)
- Students, the night before an exam, often wish that the exam could be put off for one more day. If asked on that night, such students might agree to commit to paying, say, $10 on the day of the exam for it to be held the next day. Months before the exam is held, however, students generally do not care much about having the exam put off for one day. And, in fact, if the students were made the same offer at the beginning of the term, that is, they could have the exam put off for one day by committing during registration to pay $10 on the day of the exam, they probably would reject that offer. The choice is the same, although made at different points in time. Because the outcome would change depending on the point in time, the students would exhibit time inconsistency.

- Monetary policy makers suffer from dynamic inconsistency with inflation expectations, as politicians are best off promising lower inflation in the future. But once tomorrow comes lowering inflation may have negative effects, such as increasing unemployment, so they do not make much effort to lower it. This is why independent central banks are believed to be advantageous for a country. Indeed, "a central bank with a high degree of discretion in conducting monetary policy would find itself under constant political pressure to boost the economy and reduce unemployment, but since the economy cannot exceed its potential GDP or its natural rate of unemployment over time, this policy would instead only lead to higher inflation in the long run". The first paper on this subject was published by Finn E. Kydland and Edward C. Prescott in the Journal of Political Economy in 1977, which eventually led to their winning the Nobel Memorial Prize in Economic Sciences in 2004. (See also Monetary policy credibility.)
- One famous example in literature of a mechanism for dealing with dynamic inconsistency is that of Odysseus and the Sirens. Curious to hear the Sirens' songs but mindful of the danger, Odysseus orders his men to stop their ears with beeswax and ties himself to the mast of the ship. Most importantly, he orders his men not to heed his cries while they pass the Sirens; recognizing that in the future he may behave irrationally, Odysseus limits his future agency and binds himself to a commitment mechanism (i.e., the mast) to survive this perilous example of dynamic inconsistency. This example has been used by economists to explain the benefits of commitment mechanisms in mitigating dynamic inconsistency.
- A curious case of dynamic inconsistency in psychology is described by Read, Loewenstein & Kalyanaraman (1999). In the experiment, subjects of the study were offered free rentals of movies which were classified into two categories - "lowbrow" (e.g., The Breakfast Club) and "highbrow" (e.g., Schindler's List) - and researchers analyzed patterns of choices made. In the absence of dynamic inconsistency, the choice would be expected to be the same regardless of the delay between the decision date and the consumption date. In practice, however, the outcome was different. When subjects had to choose a movie to watch immediately, the choice was consistently lowbrow for the majority of the subjects. But when they were asked to pick a movie to be watched at later date, highbrow movies were chosen far more often. Among movies picked four or more days in advance, over 70% were highbrow.
- People display a consistent bias to believe that they will have more time in the future than they have today. Specifically, there is a persistent belief among people that they are "unusually busy in the immediate future, but will become less busy shortly". However, the amount of time you have this week is generally representative of the time you have in future weeks. When people are estimating their time and when deciding if they will make a commitment, they anticipate more "time slack" in future weeks than the present week. Experiments by Zauberman & Lynch (2005) on this topic showed that people tend to discount investments of time more than money. They nicknamed this the "Yes...Damn!" effect because people tend to commit themselves to time-consuming activities like traveling to a conference under the false impression that they will be less busy in the future.

== See also ==
- Time preference
