= George Ainslie (psychologist) =

Psychologist

George W. Ainslie
- Born: 19 September 1944 (age 81)
- Occupations: Psychiatrist, psychologist, behavioral economist
- Website: www.picoeconomics.org

George W. Ainslie is an American psychiatrist, psychologist and behavioral economist. He is chief Psychiatrist at the Veterans Affairs Medical Center in Coatesville, Pennsylvania and Clinical Professor of Psychiatry at Temple University School of Medicine.

Unusual for a psychiatrist, Ainslie undertook experimental animal research in operant conditioning, under the guidance of Howard Rachlin. He investigated inter-temporal choice in pigeons, and was the first to demonstrate experimentally the phenomenon of preference reversal in favor of the more immediate outcomes as the choice point between two options, one delivered sooner than the other, is moved forward in time. He explained this in terms of hyperbolic discounting of future rewards, derived from ideas that Rachlin and others had developed from Richard Herrnstein's matching law.

Ainslie then integrated these ideas with earlier experimental and theoretical work on inter-temporal choice, for example the studies of Walter Mischel on delay of gratification in children. In his book Picoeconomics (1992) he attempted to account for these ideas, and also facts about addiction that he was concerned with from his clinical work at the Veteran Administration Medical Center, Coatesville, Pennsylvania (where he rose to become chief psychiatrist), by supposing that different parts or aspects of the personality are in conflict with one another. He grounded this idea in the Freudian theory of id, ego and superego; it became important in behavioral economics in the form of Richard Thaler's "multiple selves" theory of saving behavior.

Many of Ainslie's ideas have proved to be foundational within behavioral economics, and his work (along with that of Drazen Prelec) formed a key conduit by which ideas and data from operant conditioning joined the current of work on decision making to challenge the rational choice theory that had dominated economic thinking. He was once a Clinical Professor at Temple University in Philadelphia

== Picoeconomics ==
Picoeconomics is a term Ainslie used to describe the different implications of an experimental discovery: the tendency for people to have a stronger preference for more immediate payoffs relative to later payoffs, where the tendency increases the closer to the present both payoffs are. Given two similar rewards, humans show a preference for one that arrives sooner rather than later. Humans are said to discount the value of the later reward, by a factor that increases with the length of the delay.

Just as classical economics describes negotiation for limited resources among institutions, and microeconomics describes such negotiation among individuals, so picoeconomics describes interactions that resemble negotiation among parts that can be defined within the individual for control of that individual's finite behavioral capacity.

A large number of experiments have confirmed that spontaneous preferences by both human and nonhuman subjects follow a hyperbolic curve rather than the conventional, exponential curve that would produce consistent choice over time. For instance, when offered the choice between $50 now and $100 a year from now, many people will choose the immediate $50, whereas, given the choice between $50 in five years or $100 in six years, almost everyone will choose $100 in six years, even though that reduces to the same choice seen at five years' greater distance, as unconditioned by the initial five-year delay.

== Works ==
- Ainslie, G. (1974). "Impulse control in pigeons". Journal of the Experimental Analysis of Behavior. 21 (3): 485–489. doi:10.1901/jeab.1974.21-485. PMC 1333221. PMID 16811760.
- Ainslie, G. (1975). "Specious reward: A behavioral theory of impulsiveness and impulse control". Psychological Bulletin. 82 (4): 463–496. doi:10.1037/h0076860. PMID 1099599.
- Ainslie, G.; Herrnstein, R. J. (1981). "Preference reversal and delayed reinforcement". Animal Learning & Behavior. 9 (4): 476–482. doi:10.3758/BF03209777.
- Ainslie, G. (1991). "Derivation of "rational" economic behavior from hyperbolic discount curves". American Economic Review. 81: 134–140.
- Ainslie, G. (1992). Picoeconomics. Cambridge: Cambridge University Press. ISBN 978-0-521-26093-0
- Ainslie, G. (2001). Breakdown of will. Cambridge: Cambridge University Press. ISBN 978-0-521-59694-7
- Ainslie, G. (2003). "Uncertainty as wealth". Behavioural Processes. 64: 369–385. doi:10.1016/S0376-6357(03)00138-4.
- Ainslie, G. (2006) "A selectionist model of the ego: Implications for self-control". In N. Sebanz & W. Prinz (Eds.) Disorders of Volition (pp. 119–149). MIT Press. ISBN 978-0262513425
- Ainslie, G. (2009). "Pleasure and aversion: Challenging the conventional dichotomy". Inquiry. 52 (4): 357–377. doi:10.1080/00201740903087342.
- Ainslie, G. (2010) "The core process in addictions and other impulses: Hyperbolic discounting versus conditioning and framing". In D. Ross, H. Kincaid, D. Spurrett & P. Collins (Eds.) What is Addiction? (pp. 211–245). MIT Press. ISBN 978-0262513111
- Ainslie, G. (2011) "'Free will' as recursive self-prediction: Does a deterministic mechanism reduce responsibility?". In G. Graham & J. Poland (Eds.) Addiction and Responsibility (pp. 55–87). ISBN 978-0262015509
- Ainslie, G. (2012). "Pure hyperbolic discount curves predict 'eyes open' self-control". Theory and Decision. 73: 3–34. doi:10.1007/s11238-011-9272-5.
