= The Gas Trap =

Economic phenomenon in energy transition

The gas trap (in economics) refers to the situation in which an economy is locked into a fossil-fuel equilibrium characterised by extensive production of natural gas instead of renewable energy.

While increased gas supply may reduce emissions by displacing oil and coal, it can also make investments in renewable energy unprofitable. The resulting market dynamics can delay investment in low-emission energy sources, potentially leading to higher cumulative greenhouse gas emissions over time compared to a situation with more renewable energy.

== The market mechanism ==
Different sources of energy used for heating or electricity generally compete because they are substitute goods. An increase in the supply of one energy source tends to lower energy prices, reducing profitability and output among competing producers.

Empirical studies by Fell and Kaffine (2018) show that coal production declines when the supply of wind power expands, but also when natural gas supply increases (Knittel et al., 2016). These findings support the view that natural gas and renewable energy can displace coal in the short term.

Because coal has a higher carbon content per unit of energy than natural gas, this substitution can initially reduce emissions. Several studies document short-term emissions reductions following expansions in natural gas supply, particularly in electricity generation (Cullen and Mansur, 2017).

Market responses depend on the time horizon. Consumer and producer adjustments to price changes differ between the short run and the long run, implying that the climate effects of energy supply shocks may evolve over time (Deryugina et al., 2020).

== The dynamic mechanism ==
During an energy transition, coal producers may retain spare production capacity. As a result, coal supply can respond rapidly to price changes, allowing natural gas to replace coal in the short run. Renewable energy technologies, by contrast, typically require time-consuming investment and capacity expansion.

A growing theoretical and empirical literature shows that increased natural gas supply can therefore have asymmetric effects over time. While gas expansion tends to crowd out coal in the short run, it can reduce incentives to invest in renewable energy in the long run, slowing the transition to low-emission energy systems (McJeon et al., 2014; Gillingham and Huang, 2019).

Harstad and Holtsmark (2025) analyze this mechanism in a strategic setting. They show that gas producers, especially if they are concerned with climate change, may attempt to reduce emissions by expanding output to outcompete coal. When this strategy is anticipated by investors, however, expected future energy prices decline, reducing investment in renewable energy. As a result, additional gas capacity increasingly replaces renewables rather than coal in the long run.

The dynamic inconsistency identified in this framework is that stronger attempts by gas producers to reduce emissions through short-run coal displacement may, when anticipated, lead to higher cumulative emissions by delaying the expansion of renewable energy. In a quantitative model, Harstad and Holtsmark finds that this mechanism is relevant for European energy markets.
