= Treasury test discount rate =

The Treasury Test Discount Rate (TDR) is a rate suggested by H.M. Treasury, and employed in cost-benefit analysis. It is an attempt to value the time preference of society.

In 2003 the rate was revalued from 6% to 3.5%.
