= Werner Hildenbrand =

German mathematician and economist

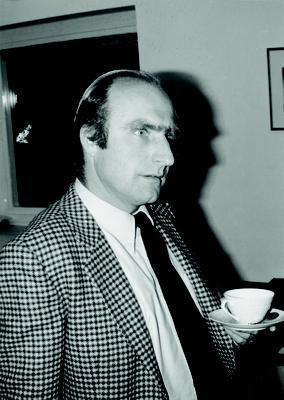
- Hildenbrand in 1973
- Born: 25 May 1936 (age 90); Göttingen, Germany
- Education: University of Heidelberg
- Known for: Contributions to the general equilibrium theory
- Scientific career
- Fields: Mathematics, economics
- Workplaces: University of Bonn
- Thesis: Über straffe Funktionale (1964)
- Doctoral advisor: Klaus Krickeberg, Gottfried Köthe
- Doctoral students: Thorsten Hens, Walter Trockel

Notes
- Contributed to the Facts and Ideas in Microeconomic Theory

Werner Hildenbrand (born 25 May 1936 in Göttingen) is a German economist and mathematician. He was educated at the University of Heidelberg, where he received his Diplom in mathematics, applied mathematics and physics in 1961. He continued his education at the University of Heidelberg and received his Ph.D. in mathematics in 1964 and his habilitation in economics and mathematics in 1968.

From 1969 to 2001, he was a professor of economics at the University of Bonn. He has held various visiting positions at, among others, the University of California, Berkeley and the University of Louvain. His research has focused on general equilibrium theory, and in particular on the existence and properties of the core of an economy.

== Books ==
- Core and Equilibria of a Large Economy, Princeton University Press, 1974.
- Introduction to Equilibrium Analysis, with Alan Kirman, North-Holland, 1976.
- Equilibrium Analysis, with Alan Kirman, North-Holland, 1988.
- Market Demand: Theory and Empirical Evidence, Princeton University Press, 1994.
