= Keynes–Ramsey rule =

Mathematical formula in macroeconomics

In macroeconomics, the Keynes–Ramsey rule is a necessary condition for the optimality of intertemporal consumption choice. Usually it is expressed as a differential equation relating the rate of change of consumption with interest rates, time preference, and (intertemporal) elasticity of substitution. If derived from a basic Ramsey–Cass–Koopmans model, the Keynes–Ramsey rule may look like

$$\dot{c}(t) =  \sigma \cdot (r - \rho) \cdot c(t)$$

where $c(t)$ is consumption and $\dot{c}(t)$ its change over time (in Newton notation), $\rho \in (0,1)$ is the discount rate, $r \in (0,1)$ is the real interest rate, and $\sigma > 0$ is the (intertemporal) elasticity of substitution.

The Keynes–Ramsey rule is named after Frank P. Ramsey, who derived it in 1928, and his mentor John Maynard Keynes, who provided an economic interpretation.

Mathematically, the Keynes–Ramsey rule is a necessary first-order condition for an optimal control problem, also known as an Euler–Lagrange equation.

== Derivation ==
Let:

- $a(t) =$ asset holdings at time $t$,
- $r(t) =$ the real interest rate at time $t$,
- $w(t) =$ non-asset income at time $t$,
- $c(t) =$ consumption at time $t$,
- $u\big(c(t)\big) =$ instantaneous utility function (or felicity function) at time $t$,
- $\rho =$ subjective discount rate.

We wish to maximize the intertemporal utility function

$$\max_{\{c(t)\}_{t=0}^\infty} \int_0^\infty u\big(c(t)\big)e^{-\rho t}\,dt \;,$$

subject to:

$$\begin{align}
\; \dot{a}(t) \;\;&{} =\;\; r(t) a(t) + w(t) - c(t)\;, \\
a(0)\;\; &{} =\;\; a_0 \;\;\;\text{is given}\;,\\
0 \;\; &{}\leq \;\; \lim_{t\to\infty}a(t)\exp\left(-\int_0^t r(s)\,ds\right)\;,
\end{align}$$

Set up the present value Hamiltonian

$$\mathcal{H} = u\big(c(t)\big)e^{-\rho t} - \lambda(t)\big[r(t)a(t) + w(t) - c(t)\big]\;,$$

where $\lambda(t)$ is the costate variable (shadow value of assets).

The first-order condition (FOC) with respect to $c(t)$ is

$$\begin{align}
\frac{\partial\mathcal{H}}{\partial c} &{} = u'(c)e^{-\rho t} - \lambda(t) = 0 \;,\\
&{} \Rightarrow \frac{u''(c)\dot{c}(t)}{u'(c)} - \rho = \frac{\dot{\lambda}(t)}{\lambda(t)}\;.
\end{align}$$

The costate equation is:

$$\dot{\lambda}(t) = -\frac{\partial\mathcal{H}}{\partial a} = -\lambda(t)r(t)\;.$$

Defining the coefficient of relative risk aversion

$$\theta\big(c(t)\big) = -\frac{u''(c)c(t)}{u'(c)} \;,$$

then plugging everything into the FOC with respect to $c(t)$ gives the Keynes-Ramsey rule:

$$\frac{\dot{c}(t)}{c(t)} = \frac{1}{\theta\big(c(t)\big)}\big[r(t) - \rho\big] \;.$$

== See also ==
- Ramsey–Cass–Koopmans model
