= Journal of Neuroscience, Psychology, and Economics =

Academic journal

- Discipline: Neuroscience, psychology, economics, management, marketing
- Language: English
- Edited by: Samuel M. McClure

Publication details
- History: 2008-present
- Publisher: American Psychological Association (United States)
- Frequency: Quarterly
- Impact factor: 1.31 (2020)

Standard abbreviations
- ISO 4: J. Neurosci. Psychol. Econ.

Indexing
- ISSN: 1937-321X (print); 2151-318X (web)
- LCCN: 2007213591
- OCLC no.: 298760344

Links
- Journal homepage; Online access

The Journal of Neuroscience, Psychology, and Economics is a peer-reviewed academic journal published by the American Psychological Association. It publishes original research dealing with the application of psychological theories and/or neuroscientific methods to business and economics and, therefore, is at the core of research in neuroeconomics, decision neuroscience, and consumer neuroscience. It is currently edited by Samuel M. McClure (Arizona State University).

== Abstracting and indexing ==
The journal is indexed by PsycINFO, EconLit, Academic Source Complete, Business Source Complete, TOC Premier and is electronically accessible through PsycARTICLES. According to the Journal Citation Reports, the journal has a 2020 impact factor of 1.31.
