= Mei Wang =

- Born: February 8, 1973 (age 53); Wuhan, China
- Occupation: Academic

Academic background
- Education: Xiamen University and Carnegie Mellon University

Academic work
- Institutions: WHU – Otto Beisheim School of Management and National Chengchi University
- Main interests: Behavioral Finance
- Notable works: Risk preferences around the world (2015)
- Notable ideas: Research in behavioral decision making

Mei Wang (Chinese: 王媚; pinyin: Wáng Mèi; February 8, 1973) is a Chinese academic who is Professor of Behavioral Finance at the WHU – Otto Beisheim School of Management in Germany. In 2018, she was also adjunct professor at National Chengchi University, Taipei, Taiwan.

She is known for her research in behavioral decision making, e.g., the St. Petersburg paradox and Prospect theory, and finance. Together with Thorsten Hens and Marc Oliver Rieger, she was one of the authors of the INTRA survey (International Test on Risk Attitudes) that collected risk and time preferences in 53 countries worldwide leading to various follow-up studies by other researchers and practitioners and media coverage by leading German newspapers.

== Early life and education ==
Mei Wang was born February 8, 1973, in Wuhan, China. She studied computer science at Xiamen University, obtained a PhD in social and decision science from Carnegie Mellon University, Pittsburgh, United States and later worked as assistant professor at the University of Zurich, Switzerland.

== Other positions ==
She is Associate Editor for Finance Research Letters and member of the editorial board of the Journal of Behavioral and Experimental Finance.

== Selected publications ==
=== INTRA survey ===
- Marc Oliver Rieger, Mei Wang, & Thorsten Hens (2015) Risk preferences around the world. Management Science, 61(3), 637-648
- Mei Wang, Marc O. Rieger, & Thorsten Hens (2016) How time preferences differ: Evidence from 53 countries. Journal of Economic Psychology, 52, 115-135
- Marc Oliver Rieger, Mei Wang, & Thorsten Hens (2016) Estimating cumulative prospect theory parameters from an international survey. Theory and Decision, 17, 1-30

=== Other topics ===
- Marc Oliver Rieger & Mei Wang (2006) Cumulative Prospect Theory and the St. Petersburg Paradox. Economic Theory, 28, 665-679
- Christoph Gort, Mei Wang, & Michael Siegrist (2008) Are pension fund managers overconfident? Journal of Behavioral Finance, 9(3), 163-170
- Mei Wang, Abraham Bernstein & Marc Chesney (2012) An experimental study on real option strategies. Quantitative Finance, 12(11), 1753-1772
