= Drazen Prelec =

American economist (born 1955)

Drazen Prelec (born 1955 in Yugoslavia) is a professor of management science and economics in the MIT Sloan School of Management, and holds appointments in the Department of Economics and in the Department of Brain and Cognitive Sciences at MIT as well. He is a pioneer in the field of neuroeconomics.

Prelec studied applied mathematics as an undergraduate at Harvard University, and went on to earn a Ph.D. from Harvard in experimental psychology, supervised by Richard Herrnstein and Duncan Luce. He was a Junior Fellow of the Harvard Society of Fellows and was a Guggenheim Fellow. He joined the MIT faculty in 1991.

Prelec has made seminal contributions to theories of intertemporal choice, in particular the generalized theory of hyperbolic discounting, as well as to non-expected utility theories, in particular probability weighting functions. He is also responsible for developing the theory of self-signaling.

A study by Prelec and Duncan Simester showed that people buying tickets to sporting events would be willing to pay significantly higher prices using credit cards than they would for cash purchases. Working in the area of Wisdom of the crowd, Prelec also devised a system, the "Bayesian Truth Serum", for eliciting more truthful answers to polls based on paired questions in which one question of each pair asks about the respondent's own opinion and the other asks the respondent to estimate others' opinions.

Prelec is of Croatian descent.
