= Social decision-making =

Social decision-making is a concept that involves business decisions with a key aspect of social and organizational psychology. Decision-making is the act of evaluating different ideas or alternatives and ultimately choosing the alternative that will most likely get you to your goal (Kahneman). Different social environments can affect somebody’s decision-making. Decision-making is important in simple day-to-day activities and is also needed in many professions. Studying and knowing what can affect someone’s decision-making and knowing what affects you and your decision-making is the first step to preventing it from affecting you. There has been much progress in recent years towards understanding social decision-making; some schools provide a social decision-making program that helps alleviate the stress that may be affecting decision-making.

Years of studying social psychology and social neuroscience have recorded that when you first interact with someone different "processes" occur. These include impression formation (impression of someone’s character based on available information on their traits/behaviors), spontaneous trait formation (forming impressions of people based on their behavior), and mental state inference. These processes would not be occurring without help from different parts of the brain. Some of the brain regions that are involved are "medial prefrontal cortex, superior temporal sulcus, temporal parietal junction, and precuneus". These processes can affect decision-making since "mental state inferences occur spontaneously and automatically." With social decision-making, it is taking both the process of decision-making and the social aspect of other people and putting those two together. The decision-making process can include learning both sides of the decision, the value to both sides, and the feedback process. In a social decision-making situation on top of the factors of decision-making you have the added stress of another person or people and their mental state. It is natural for people to be paying more attention to what impression they are making on the person they are communicating with and with this it becomes harder to tell, in some cases, the true nature of the person. A person is more apt to change their traits or personality if they want to make a different impression. "Because things like traits, which are essential to thinking about people, are invisible features of a person and are often inferred, it is harder to verify that a person is trustworthy than it is to verify that a computer, for example, is trustworthy". Human interaction and decision-making alone are both complex processes that tend to be overlooked as simple, but studying the two you can see they are in fact not simple at all and deserve to be looked at more.

Humans are strongly motivated to always predict and explain others behaviors. Social decision-making is made difficult because of the uncertainty of the other person’s behavior. Humans believe they are good at predicting other people, but it is also easy for that person to act differently or create their own actions for that time being. To help form an accurate representation of someone, social feedback is a good option. Feedback is part of the process of decision-making and it "allows people to infer something about another person as well as receive information about the impression they have formed". Feedback is beneficial to both parties. Feedback also creates some level of trust based on both taking information and receiving information on what other people think. Being labeled as trustworthy has the same effect on the brain as some type of monetary reward. Having trust is important in social decision-making, as it affects existing interactions as well as new interactions that may occur.

According to youth.gov, there is a program designed for students moving from elementary school to middle school. The purpose is to alleviate stress that seems to be heightened during this age group. The focus of the program is to focus on the students themselves and how they feel as well as the feelings of others, especially in high-stress situations. Starting to think of their goals and barriers that may get in the way of their goals is also a main priority in the program. Overcoming these issues confidently with a plan is the ultimate goal of this course, but recognizing that even the best of solutions may not lead to the resolution that was planned. Teaching these skills young will teach students at a young age how to approach situations confidently instead of backing down and most likely benefit them their whole lives into their profession. The social problem-solving skills that the course focused on included interpersonal sensitivity, means-end thinking, and planning and anticipation. Having more programs like this would make students more prepared in social decision-making and any social situation necessarily in the future. The study done with students on youth.gov handled stress and stress-induced situations much better than students who had not been in the decision-making program.

Social decision-making is becoming more recognized now than previously because of the awareness towards mental health and stress. Social decision-making involves a lot of different processes coming together at once which can easily cause stress on maybe individuals. Knowing the steps to keep focus in high-stress social situations is the first step to mastering social decision-making. Dealing with social decision-making appropriately is a good skill to have especially for your profession when in almost all professions decision-making is used. Humans are powerful, diverse, complex and very different from one another so knowing how to approach social situations with all different types of people will help to successfully make decisions in tough social situations.
