= George Loewenstein =

American educator and economist (born 1955)

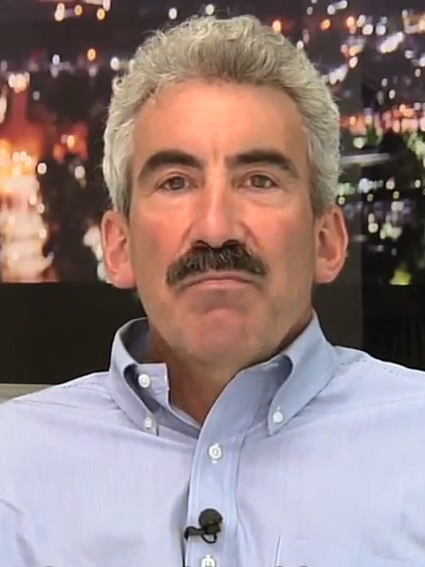
- George Loewenstein
- Born: August 9, 1955 (age 71)

Academic background
- Education: Yale University (Ph.D. 1985); Brandeis University (B.A. 1977)
- Influences: Richard Thaler

Academic work
- Discipline: Behavioral economics Neuroeconomics
- Institutions: Carnegie Mellon University
- Notable ideas: Intertemporal choice
- Website: Information at IDEAS / RePEc

George Loewenstein (born August 9, 1955) is an American educator and economist. He is the Herbert A. Simon Professor of Economics and Psychology in the Social and Decision Sciences Department at Carnegie Mellon University and director of the Center for Behavioral Decision Research. He is a leader in the fields of behavioral economics (which he is also credited with co-founding), neuroeconomics, Judgment and Decision Making.

== Biography ==
Loewenstein is the son of Sophie Freud and great-grandson of renowned psychologist and pioneering psychoanalyst Sigmund Freud. He received his B.A. in economics magna cum laude from Brandeis University in 1977 and Ph.D. in economics from Yale University in 1985 with thesis titled Expectations and Intertemporal Choice. He taught at the Booth School of Business at the University of Chicago before taking up his present position at Carnegie Mellon University. Loewenstein became a fellow of the American Academy of Arts and Sciences in 2008.

== Research ==
Loewenstein is especially known for his work regarding intertemporal choice and affective forecasting.

=== Hot-cold empathy gaps ===
Hot-cold empathy gaps are one of Loewenstein's major contributions to behavioral economics. The crux of this idea is that human understanding is "state dependent," that is, when one is angry it is difficult to understand what it is like for one to be happy, and vice versa. The implications of this were explored in the realm of sexual decision-making, where young men in an unaroused "cold state" fail to predict that when they are in an aroused "hot state" they will be more likely to make risky sexual decisions, such as not using a condom.

=== Evaluability ===
Along with co-authors Christopher Hsee, Sally Blount and Max Bazerman, Loewenstein pioneered research on evaluability and joint-separate preference reversals. This theory states that attributes of an option that are well known, such as GPA for college candidates, are given greater weight than attributes one knows little about, such as number of programs written in an obscure language, when one is evaluating options in isolation (separate evaluation). However, when two candidates are considered together, the less evaluable option is given increased weight because it is possible to make a simple comparison between the two options on that attribute (i.e., more or fewer programs written in an obscure language).
