= Social planner =

Decision-maker who attempts to maximize social welfare

In welfare economics, a social planner is a hypothetical decision-maker who attempts to maximize some notion of social welfare. The planner is a fictional entity who chooses allocations for every agent in the economy—for example, levels of consumption and leisure—that maximize a social welfare function subject to certain constraints (e.g., a physical resource constraint, or incentive compatibility constraints). This so-called planner's problem is a mathematical constrained optimization problem. Solving the planner's problem for all possible Pareto weights (i.e., weights on each type of agent in the economy) yields all Pareto efficient allocations.

== Connection with the fundamental welfare theorems ==
Any Pareto efficient allocation is a solution to a planner's problem. However, the planner is a purely fictional entity; solving the planner's problem requires knowledge of consumers' preferences and all physical resource constraints in the economy. Thus, a natural question is whether a decentralized market could implement a Pareto efficient allocation, or conversely, whether the outcomes from a decentralized market are Pareto efficient. The fundamental theorems of welfare economics answer these questions, under certain key assumptions.

The first welfare theorem states that, under certain conditions (for example, if there are no externalities), if an allocation and a set of prices constitute a competitive equilibrium, then the allocation is Pareto efficient.

The second welfare theorem states that, under certain conditions, any Pareto efficient allocation can be decentralized as a competitive equilibrium.

== See also ==
- Pareto efficiency
- Social welfare function
- Welfare economics
- Constrained optimization
- Production-possibility frontier
