= Evolutionary finance =

Evolutionary finance is an approach to studying finance that uses random dynamical systems theory to examine financial markets where there are complex interactions between investment strategies and subsequent wealth dynamics. In markets that can be characterised as random dynamical systems, equilibria tend to hold only in the short term. The use of continuous-time evolutionary finance models can be seen as generalizations of continuous-time financial mathematics. One innovative feature is the flexibility such models have to both different trading frequencies and different patterns of dividend payments.
