= Exponential discounting =

Discount function in which future returns are weighted exponentially

In economics, exponential discounting is a specific form of the discount function, used in the analysis of choice over time (with or without uncertainty). Formally, exponential discounting occurs when total utility is given by

$U \Bigl(\{c_t\}_{t=t_1}^{t_2} \Bigr) = \sum_{t=t_1}^{t_2} \delta^{t-t_1}(u(c_t))$

where c_{t} is consumption at time t, δ is the exponential discount factor, and u is the instantaneous utility function.

In continuous time, exponential discounting is given by

$U \Bigl(\{c(t)\}_{t=t_1}^{t_2} \Bigl) = \int_{t_1}^{t_2} e^{-\rho (t-t_1)}u(c(t))\,dt$

Exponential discounting implies that the marginal rate of substitution between consumption at any pair of points in time depends only on how far apart those two points are. Exponential discounting is not dynamically inconsistent. A key aspect of the exponential discounting assumption is the property of dynamic consistency— preferences are constant over time. In other words, preferences do not change with the passage of time unless new information is presented. For example, consider an investment opportunity that has the following characteristics: pay a utility cost of C at date t = 2 to earn a utility benefit of B at time t = 3. At date t = 1, this investment opportunity is considered favorable; hence, this function is: −δC + δ^2 B > 0. Now consider from the perspective of date t = 2, this investment opportunity is still viewed as favorable given −C + δB > 0. To view this mathematically, observe that the new expression is the old expression multiplied by 1/δ. Therefore, the preferences at t = 1 is preserved at t = 2; thus, the exponential discount function demonstrates dynamically consistent preferences over time.

For its simplicity, the exponential discounting assumption is the most commonly used in economics. However, alternatives like hyperbolic discounting have more empirical support.

== See also ==
- Temporal discounting
- Hyperbolic discounting
- Intertemporal choice
- Keynes–Ramsey rule
