= Hyperbolic discounting =

Economics concept

In economics, hyperbolic discounting is a time-inconsistent model of delay discounting. It is one of the cornerstones of behavioral economics and its brain-basis is actively being studied by neuroeconomics researchers.

According to the discounted utility approach, intertemporal choices are no different from other choices, except that some consequences are delayed and hence must be anticipated and discounted (i.e., reweighted to take into account the delay).

Given two similar rewards, humans show a preference for one that arrives in a more prompt timeframe. Humans are said to discount the value of the later reward, by a factor that increases with the length of the delay. In the financial world, this process is normally modeled in the form of exponential discounting, a time-consistent model of discounting. Many psychological studies have since demonstrated deviations in instinctive preference from the constant discount rate assumed in exponential discounting. Hyperbolic discounting is an alternative mathematical model that agrees more closely with these findings.

According to hyperbolic discounting, valuations fall relatively rapidly for earlier delay periods (as in, from now to one week), but then fall more slowly for longer delay periods (for instance, more than a few days). For example, in an early study subjects said they would be indifferent between receiving $15 immediately or $30 after 3 months, $60 after 1 year, or $100 after 3 years. These indifferences reflect annual discount rates that declined from 277% to 139% to 63% as delays got longer. This contrasts with exponential discounting, in which valuation falls by a constant factor per unit delay and the discount rate stays the same.

The standard experiment used to reveal a test subject's hyperbolic discounting curve is to compare short-term preferences with long-term preferences. For instance: "Would you prefer a dollar today or three dollars tomorrow?" or "Would you prefer a dollar in one year or three dollars in one year and one day?" It has been claimed that a significant fraction of subjects will take the lesser amount today, but will gladly wait one extra day in a year in order to receive the higher amount instead. Individuals with such preferences are described as "present-biased".

The most important consequence of hyperbolic discounting is that it creates temporary preferences for small rewards that occur sooner over larger, later ones. Individuals using hyperbolic discounting reveal a strong tendency to make choices that are inconsistent over time – they make choices today that their future self would prefer not to have made, despite knowing the same information. This dynamic inconsistency happens because hyperbolas distort the relative value of options with a fixed difference in delays in proportion to how far the choice-maker is from those options.

== Observations ==
The phenomenon of hyperbolic discounting is implicit in Richard Herrnstein's "matching law", which states that when dividing their time or effort between two non-exclusive, ongoing sources of reward, most subjects allocate in direct proportion to the rate and size of rewards from the two sources, and in inverse proportion to their delays. That is, subjects' choices "match" these parameters.

After the report of this effect in the case of delay, George Ainslie pointed out that in a single choice between a larger, later and a smaller, sooner reward, inverse proportionality to delay would be described by a plot of value by delay that had a hyperbolic shape, and that when the smaller, sooner reward is preferred, this preference can be reversed by increasing both rewards' delays by the same absolute amount. Ainslie's research showed that a substantial number of subjects reported that they would prefer $50 immediately rather than $100 in six months, but would NOT prefer $50 in 3 months rather than $100 in nine months, even though this was the same choice seen at 3 months' greater distance. More significantly, those subjects who said they preferred $50 in 3 months to $100 in 9 months said they would NOT prefer $50 in 12 months to $100 in 18 months—again, the same pair of options at a different distance—showing that the preference-reversal effect did not depend on the excitement of getting an immediate reward. Nor does it depend on human culture; the first preference reversal findings were in rats and pigeons.

Many subsequent experiments have confirmed that spontaneous preferences by both human and nonhuman subjects follow a hyperbolic curve rather than the conventional, exponential curve that would produce consistent choice over time. For instance, when offered the choice between $50 now and $100 a year from now, many people will choose the immediate $50. However, given the choice between $50 in five years or $100 in six years almost everyone will choose $100 in six years, even though that is the same choice seen at five years' greater distance.

Hyperbolic discounting has also been found to relate to real-world examples of self-control. Indeed, a variety of studies have used measures of hyperbolic discounting to find that drug-dependent individuals discount delayed consequences more than matched nondependent controls, suggesting that extreme delay discounting is a fundamental behavioral process in drug dependence. Some evidence suggests pathological gamblers also discount delayed outcomes at higher rates than matched controls. Whether high rates of hyperbolic discounting precede addictions or vice versa is currently unknown, although some studies have reported that high-rate discounters are more likely to consume alcohol and cocaine than lower-rate discounters. Likewise, some have suggested that high-rate hyperbolic discounting makes unpredictable (gambling) outcomes more satisfying.

The degree of discounting is vitally important in describing hyperbolic discounting, especially in the discounting of specific rewards such as money. The discounting of monetary rewards varies across age groups due to the varying discount rate. The rate depends on a variety of factors, including the species being observed, age, experience, and the amount of time needed to consume the reward.

== Mathematical model ==
=== Step-by-step explanation ===
Suppose that in a study, participants are offered the choice between taking x dollars immediately or taking y dollars n days later. Suppose further that one participant in that study employs exponential discounting and another employs hyperbolic discounting. Both participants know that they can invest the money they receive today in a savings plan that gives them an interest of r. Both of them realize that they should take x dollars immediately if the future value of the savings plan will yield more than y dollars n days later. Each participant correctly understands the fundamental question being asked: "For any given value of y dollars and n days, what is the minimum amount x of dollars, that I should be willing to accept? In other words, how many dollars would I need to invest today to get y dollars n days from now?" Each will take x dollars if x is greater than the answer that they calculate, and each will take y dollars n days from now if x is smaller than that answer. However, the methods that they use to calculate that amount and the answers that they get will be different, and only the exponential discounter will use the correct method and get a reliably correct result:

- The exponential discounter thinks "The savings plan adds to its value, in each day, r percent of the value that it had the previous day. So every day it multiplies its value once by (100% + r%). So if I hold the investment for n days, its value will have multiplied itself by this amount n times, making that value (100% + r%)^{n} of what it was at the start – that is, (1 + r)^{n} times what it was at the start. So to figure out how much I would need to start with today to get y dollars n days from now, I need to divide y dollars by (1 + r)^{n}."
- The hyperbolic discounter, however, thinks "The savings plan adds to its value, in each day, r percent. Therefore, after n days, it adds to its value r × n percent [There lies the hyperbolic discounter's error]. So to figure out how much I would need to start with today to get y dollars n days from now, I need to divide y dollars by (1 + nr)."

As n becomes very large, the value of (1 + r)^{n} becomes much larger than the value of (1 + nr), with the effect that the value of $\tfrac{y}{(1 + r)^n}$ becomes much smaller than the value of $\tfrac{y}{1 + nr}.$ Therefore, the minimum value of x (the number of dollars in the immediate choice) that suffices to be greater than that amount will be much smaller than the hyperbolic discounter thinks, with the result that they will perceive x-values in the range from $\tfrac{y}{(1 + r)^n}$ to $\tfrac{y}{1 + nr}$ inclusive as being too small and, as a result, irrationally turn those alternatives down when they are in fact the better investment.

=== Formal model ===
Hyperbolic discounting is mathematically described as
$$g(D) = \frac{1}{1+kD}$$

where g(D) is the discount factor that multiplies the value of the reward, D is the delay in the reward, and k is a parameter governing the degree of discounting (for example, the interest rate). This is compared with the formula for exponential discounting:
$$f(D) = e^{-kD}$$

==== Comparison ====
Consider $f(D)=2^{-D},$ an exponential discounting function with $k = \ln 2 \approx 0.69$ and $g(D) = \tfrac{1}{1+D},$ a hyperbolic function with $k = 1$, and suppose both use units of weeks to measure D, the delay. Then the exponential discounting a week from "now" (D = 0) is
$$\frac{f(1)}{f(0)} = \frac{1}{2},$$
and the exponential discounting from D weeks of delay to D + 1 weeks is
$$\frac{f(D + 1)}{f(D)} = \frac{1}{2},$$
so the incremental discount associated with an additional week of delay is the same. For the hyperbolic model using g(D), the discount for a week from now is
$$\frac{g(1)}{g(0)} = \frac{1}{2},$$
which is the same as for f in the exponential model, while the incremental discount for an additional week after a delay of D weeks is not the same:
$$\frac{g(D+1)}{g(D)} = 1 - \frac{1}{D+2}$$
From this one can see that the two models of discounting are the same "now"; this is the reason for the choice of interest rate parameters k. However, when D is much greater than 1,
$$\frac{g(D+1)}{g(D)} \approx 1,$$
so that the hyperbolic discounting of an additional week after a long delay is almost no discount at all, while the exponential discount factor is still 1/2, so there is still substantial discounting in the far future. Hyperbolic discounting places very little discount on an additional week of delay beyond an already large delay, while exponential discounting places a constant discount on every week of delay, whether it is far in the future or the next week.

=== Quasi-hyperbolic approximation ===
The "quasi-hyperbolic" discount function (sometimes called "beta-delta discounting"), proposed by Laibson (1997), approximates the hyperbolic discount function above in discrete time by

$$f(D) =
\begin{cases}
1 & D = 0 \\
\beta \delta^D & D = 1, 2, 3, ...
\end{cases}$$

where β and δ are constants between 0 and 1; and D is the delay in the reward, but now it takes only integer values. The condition f(0) = 1 states that rewards taken at the present time are not discounted.

Quasi-hyperbolic discounting retain much of the analytical tractability of exponential discounting while capturing the key qualitative feature of hyperbolic discounting.

== Explanations ==
=== Uncertain risks ===
Whether discounting future gains is rational or not—and at what rate such gains should be discounted—depends greatly on circumstances. Many examples exist in the financial world, for example, where it is reasonable to assume that there is an implicit risk that the reward will not be available at the future date, and furthermore that this risk increases with time. Consider paying $50 for dinner today or delaying payment for sixty years but paying $100,000. In this case, the restaurateur would be reasonable to discount the promised future value as there is significant risk that it might not be paid (e.g. due to the death of the restaurateur or the diner).

Uncertainty of this type can be quantified with Bayesian analysis. For example, suppose that the probability for the reward to be available after time t is, for known hazard rate λ,

$$P(R_t|\lambda) = \exp(-\lambda t),\,$$

but the rate is unknown to the decision maker. If the prior probability distribution of λ is

$$p(\lambda) = \exp(-\lambda/k)/k,\,$$

then the decision maker will expect that the probability of the reward after time t is

$$P(R_t) = \int_0^\infty P(R_t|\lambda) p(\lambda) d\lambda = \frac{1}{1 + k t},\,$$

which is exactly the hyperbolic discount rate. Similar conclusions can be obtained from other plausible distributions for λ.

== Applications ==
More recently these observations about discount functions have been used to study saving for retirement, personal income to drug addiction., borrowing on credit cards, and procrastination. It has frequently been used to explain addiction. Hyperbolic discounting has also been offered as an explanation of the divergence between privacy attitudes and behaviour.

== Present values of annuities ==
=== Present value of a standard annuity ===
The present value of a series of equal annual cash flows in arrears discounted hyperbolically is

$$V = P \frac{\ln(1+kD)}{k},\,$$

where V is the present value, P is the annual cash flow, D is the number of annual payments and k is the factor governing the discounting.

== Criticism ==
Several alternative explanations of non-exponential discounting have been proposed. An article from 2003 noted that this pattern might be better explained by a similarity heuristic than by hyperbolic discounting. Subjects have also reported changing relative preferences as they see more details of what they are choosing—a "temporal construal" effect.

A study by Daniel Read introduces "subadditive discounting": the fact that discounting over a delay increases if the delay is divided into smaller intervals. This hypothesis may explain the main finding of many studies in support of hyperbolic discounting—the observation that impatience declines with time–while also accounting for observations not predicted by hyperbolic discounting. However, although these observations depart from exponential discounting, they do not entail preference reversal as time from the choice to the earlier reward increases.

Arousal of appetite or emotion does sometimes lead to preference reversal, and this has been the most widely accepted alternative to a simply hyperbolic function: hyperboloid or quasi-hyperbolic discounting fuses exponential curves with an arousal bump as a visceral reward becomes imminent. Such cases are obviously important, but still do not account for cases where either both or neither choice is made during arousal.

The most obvious objection to hyperbolic discounting is that many or most people learn to choose consistently over time in most situations. Similarly, a 2014 paper criticized the existing studies for mostly using data collected from university students and being too quick to conclude that the hyperbolic model of discounting is correct. Human experiments have frequently reported wide between-subject variations. If overcoming the tendency to temporary preference takes learning, the next obvious task for experimenters is to test theories of how and when this learning occurs (e.g. Ainslie, 2012).

== See also ==
- Akrasia
- Delayed gratification
- Temporal motivation theory
- Time preference
- Time value of money
