= Discount function =

Economic model which weighs rewards based on when they are received

In economics, a discount function is used in economic models to describe the weights placed on rewards received at different points in time. For example, if time is discrete and utility is time-separable, with the discount function f(t) having a negative first derivative and with c_{t} (or c(t) in continuous time) defined as consumption at time t, total utility from an infinite stream of consumption is given by:

$$U\Bigl( \{c_t\}_{t=0}^\infty \Bigr) = \sum_{t=0}^\infty {f(t)u(c_t)}$$

Total utility in the continuous-time case is given by:

$$U \Bigl( \{c(t)\}_{t=0}^\infty \Bigr) = \int_{0}^\infty {f(t)u(c(t)) dt}$$

provided that this integral exists.

Exponential discounting and hyperbolic discounting are the two most commonly used examples.

== See also ==
- Discounted utility
- Intertemporal choice
- Temporal discounting
