= Time preference =

Difference in valuation of a payoff when receiving it earlier versus later

In behavioral economics, time preference (or time discounting, delay discounting, temporal discounting, long-term orientation) is the current relative valuation placed on receiving a good at an earlier date compared with receiving it at a later date. Applications for these preferences include finance, health, and climate change.

Time preferences are captured mathematically in the discount function. The main models of discounting include exponential, hyperbolic, and quasi hyperbolic. The higher the time preference, the higher the discount placed on returns receivable or costs payable in the future.

Several factors correlate with an individual's time preference, including age, income, race, risk, and temptation. On a larger level, ideas such as sign effects, sub-additivity, and the elicitation method can influence how people display time preference. Time preference can also inform wider preferences about real world behavior and attitudes, such as pro-social behavior. Cultural differences can explain differences in discounting as they both have similar underlying psychological influences. The discount rate is also useful in many fields, such as finance and climate change.

== Example ==
An individual's time preference can be found in choices between smaller-sooner and larger-later rewards. A person offered $100 today or $110 in one month reveals their discount rate. Choosing the immediate $100, suggests an annual discount rate of at least 10%, whereas indifference of preference for the delayed amount indicates a lower rate. Psychologists and economists use series of similar questions (money earlier or later or MEL methods) to estimate preferences.

In everyday terms, time preferences appear in decisions like whether or not to contribute to a retirement account. Choosing to not contribute a portion of one's paycheck to a retirement account is a high time preference decision, whereas contributing to said account is a low time preference decision.

== History and development ==
Work on time preference began with John Rae's "The Sociological Theory of Capital" in an attempt to answer why wealth differed across nations. He theorized that it was due to differences in saving and investment from the population, ultimately driven by tolerance for uncertainty and ability to delay gratification. Later, views expanded to examine why individuals may have differences in how they trade off benefits between the present and the future. Some theories include risk, preferences for immediate gratification, and ability to estimate future wants. This means that people may view the future as uncertain, and therefore, they should consume now instead of saving for later. They may also have a compulsion to consume now and are unable to delay the pleasure. Lastly, they may be unable to comprehend their future needs and wants. Irving Fisher was the first person to model these choices economically as a tradeoff between your current and future self.

Such ideas were later formalized by Paul Samuelson in "A Note on Measurement of Utility." In this paper, he described a model wherein people want to maximize their utility over all future periods, with future utility being devalued exponentially from the present value.

=== Neoclassical views ===
In the neoclassical theory of interest due to Irving Fisher, the rate of time preference is usually taken as a parameter in an individual's utility function which captures the trade off between consumption today and consumption in the future, and is thus exogenous and subjective. It is also the underlying determinant of the real rate of interest. The rate of return on investment is generally seen as return on capital, with the real rate of interest equal to the marginal product of capital at any point in time. Arbitrage, in turn, implies that the return on capital is equalized with the interest rate on financial assets (adjusting for factors such as inflation and risk). Consumers, who are facing a choice between consumption and saving, respond to the difference between the market interest rate and their own subjective rate of time preference ("impatience") and increase or decrease their current consumption according to this difference. This changes the amount of funds available for investment and capital accumulation, as in for example the Ramsey growth model.

In the long run steady state, consumption's share in a person's income is constant which pins down the rate of interest as equal to the rate of time preference, with the marginal product of capital adjusting to ensure this equality holds. In this view, it is not that people discount the future because they can receive positive interest rates on their savings. Rather, the causality goes in the opposite direction; interest rates must be positive in order to induce impatient individuals to forgo current consumption in favor of future.

Time preference is a key component of the Austrian school of economics; it is used to understand the relationship between saving, investment and interest rates.

=== Historical understanding in relation to interest rates ===
The Catholic scholastic philosophers firstly brought up sophisticated explanations and justifications of return on capital, including risk and the opportunity cost of profit forgone, associated with the discount factor. However, they failed to interpret the interest on a riskless loan and hence denounced the time preference discounter as sinful and usurious.

Later, Conrad Summenhart, a theologian at the University of Tübingen, used time preference to explain the discount loans, where the lenders won't profit usuriously from the loans as the borrowers would accept the price the lenders ask. A half-century later, Martin de Azpilcueta Navarrus, a Dominican canon lawyer and monetary theorist at the University of Salamanca, held the view that present goods, such as money, will naturally be worth more on the market than future goods (money). At about the same time, Gian Francesco Lottini da Volterra, an Italian humanist and politician, discovered time preference and contemplated time preference as an overestimation of "a present" that can be grasped immediately by the senses. Two centuries later, Ferdinando Galiani, a Neapolitan abbot, used an analogy to point out that just similar to the exchange rate, the interest rate links and equates the present value to the future value, and under people's subjective mind, these two physically non-identical items should be equal.

These scattered thoughts and progression of theories inspired Anne Robert Jacques Turgot, a French statesman, to generate a full-scale time preference theory: what must be compared in a loan transaction is not the value of money lent with the value repaid, but rather the 'value of the promise of a sum of money compared to the value of money available now; in addition, he analyzed the relation between money supply and interest rates: If money supply increases and people with insensitive time preference receive the money, then these people tend to hoard money for savings instead of going for consumptions, which will cause interest rates to fall while prices to rise.

== Models of discounting ==
Temporal discounting (also known as delay discounting, time discounting) is the tendency of people to discount rewards as they approach a temporal horizon in the future or the past (i.e., become so distant in time that they cease to be valuable or to have addictive effects). To put it another way, it is a tendency to give greater value to rewards as they move away from their temporal horizons and towards the "now". For instance, a nicotine deprived smoker may highly value a cigarette available any time in the next 6 hours but assign little or no value to a cigarette available in 6 months.

Regarding terminology, from Frederick et al. (2002):

We distinguish time discounting from time preference. We use the term time discounting broadly to encompass any reason for caring less about a future consequence, including factors that diminish the expected utility generated by a future consequence, such as uncertainty or changing tastes. We use the term time preference to refer, more specifically, to the preference for immediate utility over delayed utility.

This term is used in intertemporal economics, intertemporal choice, neurobiology of reward and decision making, microeconomics and recently neuroeconomics. Traditional models of economics assumed that the discounting function is exponential in time leading to a monotonic decrease in preference with increased time delay; however, more recent neuroeconomic models suggest a hyperbolic discount function which can address the phenomenon of preference reversal. Temporal discounting is also a theory particularly relevant to the political decisions of individuals, as people often put their short term political interests before the longer term policies. This can be applied to the way individuals vote in elections but can also apply to how they contribute to societal issues like climate change, that is primarily a long term threat and therefore not prioritized.

There have been many mathematical models of time preference that attempt to explain intertemporal preferences.

=== Exponential discounted utility ===
Exponential discounted utility was first described in the discounted utility model. The equation is as follows:

$U^t(c_t, \dots, c_T) = \sum_{k=0}^{T-t} D(k) u(c_{t+k})$

where

$D(k) = \left(\frac{1}{1 + \rho}\right)^k$

is commonly thought of as the discount function, with $\rho$ being the discount rate. It says that your value of the future is exponentially less than your value of the present, as scaled by $\rho$ and $k$ . Although the equation was never meant to be normative, ie, making a recommendation as to how people behave, it was the first template for modeling utility over time. Later, its descriptive, validity, or ability to describe how people actually behave, was evaluated. Inconsistencies led to the theorizing of a new equation for time preference.

=== Hyperbolic discounting ===
Although the exponential equation provides a nice rationale for discounting in accordance with utility theory, the apparent rate, when measured in the lab, is not constant. It actually declines over time. This means that the difference between receiving $10 tomorrow and $11 in two days is different from receiving $10 in 100 days and $11 in 101 days. Although the difference between the values and the times is the same, people value the two options at a different discount rate. The $1 is more heavily discounted between tomorrow and two days than it is between 100 and 101 days, meaning that people prefer the $10 option more in the two day case than in the 100 day case.

Such preferences fit a hyperbolic curve. The first hyperbolic delay function was of the form

$$D(k) =
\begin{cases}
1 & \text{if } k = 0 \\
\beta \delta^k & \text{if } k > 0
\end{cases}$$

This function describes a difference between the discount rate today and the next period, and then constant discounting after. It is commonly called the $(\beta, \delta)$ model.

A simple hyperbolic delay discounting equation is that of

$\frac{v}{V} = \frac{1}{1 + kD}$

Where $v$ is the discounted value, $V$ is the non-discounted value, $k$ is the discount rate, and $D$ is the delay. This is one of the most common hyperbolic discounting functions used today, and is especially useful in comparing two discounting scenarios, as the $k$ parameter can be easily interpreted.

=== Quasi-hyperbolic discounting ===
The last major model is that of quasi-hyperbolic discounting. Researchers found that there is a first day effect, meaning that people greatly value immediate rewards over those in the future. Like the previous example, imagine now that you are offered $10 today or $11 tomorrow. You are also offered $10 tomorrow or $11 in two days. The preference for the $10 in the today case is typically greater than the preference for the $10 tomorrow case.

This can be captured by a quasi-hyperbolic curve, wherein there is a fitted parameter for the magnitude of the first day effect. This is commonly called the beta-delta model, wherein there is a beta parameter that accounts for the present bias. The equation for utility over time looks like

$U_t(u_t, u_{t+1}, \dots, u_T) = \delta^t u_t + \beta \sum_{s=t+1}^T \delta^{s-t} u_s$

This explains that the sum of your current and all future utilities is equal to a delta parameter multiplied by your current utility plus all your future discounted utilities (scaled by beta).

== Asymmetries ==
Despite the equations meant to describe behavior, when measuring preferences over real world decisions, it was noted that there were some inconsistencies. People's preferences would change based on the framing of the question or the exact decision being made; one discount rate was hard to find. The main findings are as follows "(1) gains are discounted more than losses; (2) small amounts are discounted more than large amounts; (3) greater discounting is shown to avoid delay of a good than to expedite its receipt; (4) in choices over sequences of outcomes, improving sequences are often preferred to declining sequences though positive time preference dictates the opposite; and (5) in choices over sequences, violations of independence are pervasive, and people seem to prefer spreading consumption over time in a way that diminishing marginal utility alone cannot explain".

=== Sign and magnitude effects ===
Work by Richard Thaler found the first two main effects. To measure gains and losses, he asked about the same numerical earnings or debts framed as winnings from a bank lottery or a traffic ticket. He found that gains are discounted more than losses, meaning that, they valued earning money sooner than delaying debts. He also found the discount rate to be higher when asking about tradeoffs between large amounts of money versus small amounts of money, even though the rate of substitution was the same.

Some current work explains the psychological underpinnings of these findings. One suggestion is the idea of contemplation emotion, or the feeling of waiting for an event to occur. The idea is that one wants a positive event to occur and does not want to wait for it; on the other hand, people may not mind to delay a negative outcome such as a monetary loss. This can help explain the sign effect.

=== Temptation ===
Classic economic theory says that more options does not decrease utility. If you are given a completely useless option, it does not hurt you, because you can simply decide not to take it, and your information only increases. However, dynamic inconsistencies can be explained by rational beliefs and temptation. Essentially, there is a psychological cost to resisting the temptation of an activity, so you restrict your future choice set to not include the tempting activity for your long term benefit. Such theories explain why people pay in advance for commitment devices. For example, a person has to choose what to do in the future: nap or go to the gym. They may choose to form some sort of commitment device to go to the gym. Economic theory would argue that the person would be better off leaving the option to nap open, if there is no cost. However, theories of temptation argue that removing the option to nap removed the cost of rejecting the temptation to nap.

=== Sub additive discounting ===
Sub additive discounting is an example of sub additive preferences, meaning that when a problem is broken down into its individual components, people assign greater weights to the components than they would to the whole. In the context of time preference, it is argued that as the interval of time is broken down into smaller and smaller partitions, discounting increases. Daniel Read found evidence of this wherein discounting was much lower when the time interval was divided into three separate parts. He argues that this responsible for the hyperbolic appearance of discount preferences.

=== Experimental elicitation methods ===
There have been many attempts to measure a discount rate using experimental methods. Yet, there is still no consensus on the rate. This may be due to the varying elicitation methods for the studies themselves. Put another way, how a study asks questions to uncover the discount rate can influence the result itself.

The first experiments to measure discount rates were called MEL (money earlier or later) experiments, wherein participants were asked about their preferences between receiving a certain some of money now and a different sum of money later. Yet, measures of time preferences and inter-temporal tradeoffs came before this. One of the most famous examples is that of the marshmallow experiment. In this Mischel and Ebbesen told kids that they could have one marshmallow now, or, if they waited until the experimenter left and returned, they could have two.

The most common way to measure discount rates is as follows. Offered a choice of $100 today and $100 in one month, individuals will most likely choose the $100 now. However, should the question change to having $100 today, or $1,000 in one month, individuals will most likely choose the $1,000 in one month. The $100 can be conceptualized as a Smaller Sooner Reward (SSR), and the $1,000 can be conceptualized as a Larger Later Reward (LLR). Researchers who study temporal discounting are interested in the point in time in which an individual changes their preference for the SSR to the LLR, or vice versa. For example, although an individual may prefer $1,000 in one month over $100 now, they may switch their preference to the $100 if the delay to the $1,000 is increased to 60 months (5 years). This means that this person values $1,000, after a delay of 60 months, less than $100 now. The key is to find the point in time in which the individual values the LLR and the SSR as being equivalent. That is known as the indifference point. Preferences can be measured by asking people to make a series of choices between immediate and delayed payoffs, where the delay period and the payoff amounts are varied.

=== Revealed preferences methods ===
Another stream of research focuses on estimating the discount rate from data on real world choices. Many economic models have looked at different financial puzzles and decisions to estimate a discount rate. Some types of data include asset purchases and pricing, high frequency consumption data, or social security payments. All of these situations involve financial decisions between the present and future. Therefore, one can fit an economic model to the situation, and then estimate the discount parameter.

As another example, one can infer the environmental discount rate from something like air conditioner purchases. This is because, investing in an energy efficient air conditioner saves both money and energy in the long run but requires more money upfront. This setup establishes a tradeoff between current value (money now) vs future value (savings later). One paper analyzed a survey of air conditioner purchases using a hedonic pricing method. Essentially, "the price of a good is specified as a function of a set of its attributes," and they find that the discount rate is 13.6%.

== Factors ==
Although the average discount rate may be of interest, that average typically obscures differences in individual valuations. Many factors that differ by people can influence their discount rates. This helps predict time preference for specific subgroups.

=== Age & Income ===
The effect of age on discounting has long been studied. There are many theories as to why age might affect time preference: risk tolerance, time perspective, and importantly, the covariant of income. In one of the most cited studies on this topic describes this interaction, the authors find that in a high-income group, discounting was the same across ages. However, within the group of older adults, being low income greatly increased discounting. A recent meta-analysis on the effect of age alone concluded that there is no effect of age alone on discounting. A response to this article explained that although there may be no overall effect, within specific income groups, there are differences by age. Although age doesn't affect high-income people's time preferences, it does affect the low-income group. Younger, low-income people have higher discounting than older, low-income people. They also provide a mechanism by which this phenomenon occurs: a scarcity mindset increases discounting. By controlling for scarcity, the differences in discounting disappeared. Such results indicate that low-income, younger people experience more distress caused by scarcity, which causes them to want rewards more immediately.

=== Gender ===
Gender may also influence the rate of time preference. It has been shown that men generally exhibit a higher rate of discounting than women, choosing sooner rewards more often. It is theorized that it is due to women's ability to delay gratification, and this ability is also useful in real life scenarios. Such situations include motherhood and saving/investment. Women may be more suited towards long term orientation because they are tasked more with parenting. It has also been found that women save and invest more, which may mean they are more adapted to delayed gratification.

=== Race ===
Race is also thought to play a role in time preference. Andreoni et al. find that a child's ability to wait for a larger later reward was correlated with race. They did this by asking the children a series of decisions in which they could choose candy that same day or a larger amount of candy which they would receive on the next day. In analyzing the data by race, they found that black children, across all ages, were more likely to make impatient decisions than other races. In more specific contexts, race was also found to play a role. In a study of the utility of long term water quality improvements, Viscusi et al. find that black respondents displayed higher discounting than other racial groups.

=== Connection to future self ===
Another factor which may influence time preference is one's connection to their future self. This means your ability to envision or share emotions (sympathize) with one's future self. Therefore, if you feel more connected to your future, it may be easier to delay gratification. This theory has been tested in several ways. One study measured psychological connectedness by asking participants to rate how close they felt to their future selves. They also asked the participants to rate the connectedness of fictional characters. In both cases, those who felt more intertemporally connected were also more able to delay rewards.

=== Early life stress ===
A meta-analysis of early life stress, time preference, and prosocial preferences found that early life stress is predictive of time preference. The theory goes that early life stress affects our ability to think about the future. If you have more early life stress, you become more present focused to manage the current situation. The theory was confirmed in the analysis, wherein more early life stress was significantly correlated with present orientation on a future discounting task. Early life stress was also shown to be predictive of lower prosocial preferences.

== Applications ==
Many broad societal problems about how to allocate social goods between now and the future depend on time preference. Governments typically model future outcomes of the economy and planet according to some discount rate. In doing so, they are trying to calculate the welfare of both the current and future generations, taking into account issues such as stated preferences, revealed preferences, and objective future outcomes.

=== Interest rates ===
Discount rates and traditional economic problems both inform and are influenced by each other. For example, the interest rate plays an important role in individual discount rates. If one can accumulate interest at a certain rate, say 5% per year, one should not have a discount rate below this. Say you are offered $100 today or $105 in one year. You should be, at the very least, indifferent between the two, regardless of other factors. This is because, if you take the money now and invest it, you will also have $105 in one year. Coller and Williams find this to be true, showing that when you give participants information about the real world interest rates, their elicited discount rate falls.

=== Climate change ===
The discount rate is particularly important in the study of climate change. Economist Thomas Schelling argued that climate change is an intergenerational discounting problem, where we are essentially deciding how to distribute utility between the current and future generations. Crucially, he also argues that we need to also consider other ways in which we can increase the well being of underdeveloped countries both now and in the future. Climate abatement techniques, viewed through this lens, need to be weighed against other wealth redistributions, such as direct payments or subsidies for other goods and industries.

One of the first papers to address this issue was Frank Ramsey's "A Mathematical Theory of Saving." In it, he calculates the amount which a nation should save to protect future generations. He does this by trying to maximize the utility of all generations cumulatively. In solving this maximization problem, we get an equation of the form

$r = \delta + \eta g$

Here, $r$ is the rate of time preference, or the discount rate. It is the sum of the pure rate of time preference ($\delta$) and the growth rate of per capita consumption ($g$), adjusted by the factor ($\eta$), representing the elasticity of marginal utility or inter-temporal inequality aversion.

The next big finding on the climate discount rate was the Stern Review. It was a report commissioned by the UK government in 2006 on the state of climate change. Major finding of the report is that urgent action is needed to avert the worst impacts of climate change; much more urgent than previously thought. This is due to his estimation of the discount rate. In the report, Stern sets the Ramsey parameters to $\delta = .1%$, $\eta = 1$ and $g=1.3%$ , meaning $r=1.4%$ . With a discount rate this low, meaning future generations are almost equally as valued, this means that society needs to drastically reduce consumption.

There was push back against this idea, most notably from economist William Nordhaus. He wrote several papers reviewing the Stern Report and the assumptions in it. He argues that the near zero rate of time preference ($\delta = .1%$) is critical to the recommendations made. Furthermore, he says that a higher discount rate is consistent with market interest rates.

There is no consensus still on the climate discount rate that should be used. Considerations from experts span morality, interest rates, consumer preferences, intergenerational equity, and global equity. At the country level, the revealed environmental discount rates can span from 1%-10%.

== Differences in time preference across countries ==
Since many of the psychological factors that cause discounting behavior also vary across countries, it makes sense that time preference may not be universal. Due to cultural factors, different countries may view allocations between the present and the future differently.

Differences of time preferences across countries have been found in several large-scale studies, in particular the INTRA study and the GPS study.

Oded Galor and Omer Ozak explore the roots of observed differences in time preference across nations. They establish that pre-industrial agricultural characteristics that were favorable to higher return to agricultural investment triggered a process of selection, adaptation, and learning that brought about a higher prevalence of long-term orientation. These agricultural characteristics are associated with contemporary economic and human behavior such as technological adoption, education, saving, and smoking.

The most comprehensive data set of time preferences encompasses 117 countries and is calculated by merging several previous datasets, including the aforementioned INTRA- and GPS-data, but also, e.g., survey questions from the World Value Survey. Many cross-cultural studies look at the differences between two or three countries. However, some have gone further. A study on 53 counties found significant differences in time preference by country.

=== Cultural differences in predictors ===
There are many cultural differences that influence perceptions in general. Some aspects of culture which may be relevant to time preference include individualism/collectivism, uncertainty avoidance, and long term orientation. Countries with higher uncertainty avoidance have higher present bias, meaning they discount the future more steeply. On the other hand, countries higher in individualism and long term orientation discount less steeply.

== Correlation with real world behavior ==
Time preferences to not just measure differences in allocation between now and the future. Individual differences in time preference can indicate larger personality differences. This personality can predict other behavior.

=== Prosocial behavior ===
One major area of focus for time preference effects is that of prosocial behavior. This is as future allocation problems typically benefit others beyond oneself. One study found that individuals with "Future time preference" were more willing to forgo money for future others benefit. Yet, the results are still not widely confirmed. Another study by Jones and Rachlin found that only social and probability discounting predicted public-good contributions. Social discounting measures the rate at which one will tradeoff money between them and another person receiving it. For example, say you were offered $50, but if you forego it, your friend gets $60. What about your friend being offered $100. The point at which you forego the money is the social discount rate. Generally, this type of discounting resembles a hyperbolic curve as well. Probability discounting takes the same form, but with risk. Say you were offered a certain $50 or a $100 with a 50% chance of winning it. How about a 60% chance? Probability discounting is likewise hyperbolic. Both of these indicate that allocation preferences over an intangible dimension can predict more representative choices, such as donations to public goods. However, the study did not find a significant effect of delay discounting (or time preference) on public-good contributions.

== Estimating and domain differences ==
Although classic economics would say that the discount rate should be the same across domains, empirical findings have shown that this is not true. There are differences in how people discount outcomes in different domains. Specifically, three fields have been examined: money, health, and climate.

Initial research in this area was pioneered by Chapman and Elstein, who discovered discrepancies between how people discount health versus monetary outcomes. They asked people about how much they would trade between current and future money, health, and vacation outcomes. They had to choose between sooner smaller and larger later outcomes of money payments, vacation days, and illness treatment.

The findings from Odum, Baumann, and Rimington echoed earlier research by showing that individuals displayed more patience when discounting money compared to directly consumable rewards such as alcohol and food. This result, however, was only found within-subjects, meaning that people who were asked both questions discounted consumables more steeply. Between subjects (asking each group only one of the questions) did not replicate. Similar results were highlighted by Estle et al., who found consistent patterns of steeper discounting for direct consumables compared to monetary rewards. This result has been confirmed in many subsequent studies, with the hypothesis pointing to the fact that temptation is a driving factor in the difference.

Domain differences have also been found with respect to climate change. The climate discount rate has been compared to health and money. Some studies find that it is discounted differently. Further supporting the importance of domain-specific differences, Tabi utilized revealed preferences to measure discounting differences in domains including winning money, flood risk prevention, life-saving measures, and climate costs. His findings revealed significant variability, ranging from a discount rate of 3% for saving lives in 100 years to 29% for adaptation efforts to prevent flooding. This substantial variation underscores the unique considerations each domain carries.

Together, these reviews indicate that the domain of the reward or consequence plays a significant role in discounting behavior, whether it involves money, health, consumables, or environmental outcomes. The insights from these studies emphasize the importance of understanding domain-specific discounting to inform policy and decision-making across various fields.

== See also ==
- Decision theory
- Delayed gratification
- Discount function
- Discounted utility
- Discounting
- Dynamic inconsistency
- Hofstede's cultural dimensions theory – A theory of cultural differences in time preference
- Intertemporal choice
- Net present value
- Time value of money
- Treasury test discount rate
- Patience
