= Intertemporal choice =

Study of how people choose between payoffs at different times

In economics, intertemporal choice is the study of the relative value people assign to two or more payoffs at different points in time. This relationship is usually simplified to today and some future date. Intertemporal choice was introduced by Canadian economist John Rae in 1834 in the "Sociological Theory of Capital". Later, Eugen von Böhm-Bawerk in 1889 and Irving Fisher in 1930 elaborated on the model.

== Fisher model ==
=== Assumptions of the model ===
1. consumer's income is constant
2. maximization of the utility
3. anything above the line is out of explanation
4. investments are generators of savings
5. any property is indivisible and unchangeable

According to this model there are three types of consumption: past, present and future.

When making decisions between present and future consumption, the consumer takes his/her previous consumption into account.

This decision making is based on an indifference map with negative slope because if he consumes something today it means that he can't consume it in the future and vice versa.

The revenue is in form of interest rate. Nominal interest rate - inflation = real interest rate

Denote

- $r$ : interest rate
- $Y(t+1)$ : income in time $t+1$ or a future income
- $Y(t)$ : income in time $t$ or a present income

Then maximum present consumption is: $Y(t) + \frac{Y(t+1)}{1+r}$

The maximum future consumption is: $(1+r)Y(t) + Y(t+1)$

== See also ==
- Choice modelling
- Decision theory
- Discount function
- Discounted utility
- Intertemporal budget constraint
- Keynes–Ramsey rule
- Temporal discounting
