= Biology and consumer behaviour =

Field of study

Consumer behaviour is the study of the motivations surrounding a purchase of a product or service. It has been linked to the field of psychology, sociology and economics in attempts to analyse when, why, where and how people purchase in the way that they do. However, little literature has considered the link between consumption behaviour and the basics of human biology. Segmentation by biological-driven demographics such as sex and age are already popular and pervasive in marketing. As more knowledge and research is known, targeting based on consumers' biology is of growing interest and use to marketers.

As "human machines" being made up of cells controlled by a brain to influence aspects of behaviour, there must be some influence of biology on consumer behaviour and how purchase decisions are made as well. The nature versus nurture debate is at the core of how much biology influences these buying decisions, because it argues how much is can be explained through environmental and by biological factors. Neuromarketing is of interest to marketers in measuring the reaction of stimulus to marketing.

Lawson and Wooliscroft (2004) drew the link between human nature and the marketing concept, not explicitly biology, where they considered the contrasting views of Hobbes and Rousseau on mankind. Hobbes believed man had a self-serving nature whereas Rousseau was more forgiving towards the nature of man, suggesting them to be noble and dignified. Hobbes saw the need for a governing intermediary to control this selfish nature which provided a basis for the exchange theory, and also links to Mcgregor's Theory of X and Y, relevant to management literature. He also considered cooperation and competition, relevant to game theory as an explanation of man's motives and can be used for understanding the exercising of power in marketing channels. Pinker outlines why the nature debate has been suppressed by the nurture debate in his book The Blank Slate.

== Nature and consumer behaviour ==
=== Genes ===
Cells are the building blocks of all living organisms. Within these cells are coils of DNA, genetic information instructing for how cells will develop and operate. A small segment of DNA is a gene which codes for the making of proteins and passing on traits to offspring in reproduction. The main goal of a gene is to reproduce and thrive in its environment in relative to competitors. Practical implications in crime investigation, disorders and increasingly talent prediction and career decision making have considered their association with genes and biology, but the idea of biology and marketing is a growing body of knowledge. Neuromarketing is a new phenomenon studying consumer's reactions to marketing stimuli.

=== Biology affecting behaviour ===
==== Gene-centric view ====
Richard Dawkins outlines in The Selfish Gene (1976) that humans are machines made of genes, and genes are the grounding for everything people do. The gene-centric view outlines that natural selection, evolution and all behaviour must be traced back to the survival of competing genes as an extension of Darwin's theory being the survival of competing individuals. The main goal of individuals, coming from genes, is to reproduce and thrive, where thriving involves protection, conquering competition and future growth. Therefore, everything that people do relates to thriving in their environment above competition, including the way people consume as a form of survival in their environment when simply purchasing the basic physiological needs of food, water and warmth. People also consume to thrive above others, for example in conspicuous consumption where a luxury car represents money and high social status and the application of makeup makes the person and their genes seem more attractive and worthy of passing to offspring.

At least some behaviour must be influenced by genes because behaviour depends on the interaction of molecules and neurons in the brain. These interactions are a result of genes, however the influence on behaviour cannot go much further than this. Dawkins likened genes to a computer. They have been pre-programmed to build cells, develop cells and make them work together. Like a computer, the hardware is set in stone, but the software can change how they work, just like their environment. Genes indirectly influence behaviour as the nervous system and the brain is the intermediary in the transaction decision because it reasons and processes all of the gene instructions into one decision, movement or behaviour. The way neurons connect is dependent on the environment, learning and experience. This introduces the nurture side of the nature nurture debate.

=== Behaviour affecting biology ===
==== Epigenetics ====
Epigenetics is referred to as the ‘new genetics’ and phenomenon of importance to marketers because it studies how the environment can influence genes, and hence behaviour. The theory of meiosis is that exact replicas of parents' genes are passed to their offspring, with no variation influence from the environment. However genes have a protein wrapping the gene that can influence the gene expression and therefore phenotypes to the environment. How people act and consume now affects their epigenome, and consequently their offspring's genome. This supports Lamark's theory, prior to Darwin, who initially proposed the theory of genes changing with behaviour and experience. A study from the University of Auckland warned pregnant women against dieting due to the increased likelihood in their child acquiring eating disorders such as obesity, hence the way people consume food.

== Nurture and consumer behaviour ==
The other side of the debate is the environment can shape attitudes, learning, sensation, thinking and behaviour

=== Attitudes ===
People who differ in attitudes toward education probably have different beliefs about the benefit of tertiary education, different feelings about having to go to class and different levels of commitment with respect to effort in assignments.

Attitude formation can be based on facts where a rational approach is taken, weighing up the pros and cons. A lot of the time, however, people acquire their attitudes from their parents, friends, and surrounding culture through a variety of learning mechanisms. is a somewhat disturbing example of this. Marketers have long been aware of the influence of peers on attitudes and this is a particularly important concept for subcultures which are socially oriented and experienced based. Participants communicate via many means and move between geographic locations. An example of a subculture is straight edge and their consumption is therefore affected by the socially constructed attitudes of the subgroup.

The elaboration likelihood model determines how easily attitudes can be changed. If the message goes through the peripheral route, people are far more likely to be influenced by how or whom or what surroundings the message is presented in. Therefore, advertising using a celebrity endorser such as Justin Bieber for Proactive may have a large impact on a person's attitude to skin care if the message is going through the latter route.

=== Learning ===
Habituation is shared across species and is the simplest form of learning. Here a person's response to a stimulus weakens when it becomes familiar. For example, with drink driving advertising in New Zealand, a decade ago people saw cars smashing into each other as a scare tactic. The content of these adverts has become less and less shocking the more people have been exposed to them. People have now become so desensitised to them that a humour approach has to be taken and the latest example is the ‘Legend’ advert.

Classical conditioning is demonstrated in a real-world office setting.

B. F. Skinner, theorist of operant conditioning, shows how a pigeon has been taught to distinguish between two words and behaves appropriately depending on which one is being presented. It learned each response with a reward of food therefore its behaviour is being shaped by controlling its environment. An example of this conditioning in a consumer behaviour context is a cinema using a consumer incentive scheme. A consumer given a card which entitles the person to a free movie if the person brings a friend and free popcorn on Tuesdays with the purchase of a ticket per se, they are more likely to go to a movie when perhaps they wouldn't have otherwise.

Shaping is a learning technique and one of the most useful concepts for marketers assisting in the initial purchase of any new product.

=== Sensation ===
Empiricists argue all knowledge comes from the senses, but if senses are only relevant to the proximal world, how do people know the distal world? They argue it is through learning and that prior experience plays a crucial role in shaping the perceptual world. Association is a key function which here refers to linking one sensory experience to another.

=== Thinking ===
Association is also relevant in enhancing generic memory. Many New Zealanders associate Phil Collins's song ‘In the air tonight’ and a gorilla playing on a drum set with a Cadbury Chocolate advertisement.

=== Language ===
Under normal conditions, language seems to develop in a similar way among all children but when children grow up in a radically different environment their language is significantly different. A number of examples including wild children show that certain elements of the early environment are essential for language learning. Amala and Kamala and Genie never managed to fully progress to learning language. While these examples are extreme, they show that consumer's language is affected by their environment. This is especially true of marketing activities across geographical borders.

=== Behaviour ===
The environment has a profound effect on development. Social deprivation in infants and children leads to dramatic behavioural deficits as evident in the behaviour of Romanian orphans. In a consumer behaviour context, vicarious learning which involves changing behaviour by having an individual observe the actions of another and witness the consequences of that behaviour, is used to develop new responses and inhibit undesired behaviours. The former is done through educating consumers in product uses i.e. through product demonstrations and increasing attention to the message i.e. through celebrity endorsement.

== Nature versus Nurture ==
Matt Ridley suggests in Nature via Nurture (2003) the diversity of the human species is not hard-wired in the genetic code, environments are critical. Nature is not at the expense of nurture, nor is nurture at the expense of nature, there is room for both; they work together.

Genes are cogs in the machine, not gods in the sky. They are switched on and off throughout life, by external as well as internal events, their job is to absorb information from the environment at least as often as to transmit it from the past. Genes do more than carry information; they respond to experience. Susan Mineka illustrated this concept exceedingly well with her idea of prepared learning in monkeys, where she found the predisposition of genes largely affected the acquisition of fear responses to certain stimuli. Lab-reared monkeys, through vicarious experience, were easily able to acquire a fear response to a snake, but not a flower. Nature provides the instinct, and elements of nurture depend on whether the instinct is expressed.

Genes predispose individuals to determine the extent to which an individual may engage or interact with certain environments. Ridley exemplified that having ‘athletic’ genes makes one want to practice a sport, and having ‘intellectual’ genes makes one seek out intellectual activities. "The genes are the agents of nurture and are more likely to be affecting appetite more than aptitude". Genes do not make the individual intelligent, the make them more likely to enjoy learning. They encourage individuals to seek out environmental influences that will satisfy their appetites. "The environment acts as a multiplier of small genetic differences, pushing athletic children toward the sports that reward them, and pushing bright children to the books that reward them".

Whether an individual develops certain diseases or disorders is also established, to a certain degree, on the basis of nature and nurture. Genes often predispose individuals to certain disorders or diseases, while environmental factors can trigger the onset. Susceptibility of diabetes is determined by inherited differences in DNA, but environmental factors such as diet, weight, age, and physical activity seem to be triggering the onset of the disease. Genetic make-up, in addition to the environment with which the genes are exposed to, is influencing the behaviour of consumers with regard to the food choices they make. Addiction to substance abuse is partially determined by genes, which predispose individuals to have addictive personalities; however the stimuli with which an addiction develops is dependent on the environment. Addiction is persistent and compulsive, and has a significant impact upon consumer behaviour. Individuals who experience substance abuse, for example, are prone to basing their consumption primarily around the purchasing of alcohol, even at the expense of other important aspects of well-being.

== Biological segmentation ==
The link between biology and marketing is not a new phenomenon, especially through segmentation based on the biology of sex, age, and health condition. Certain products, for example, maternity products, are targeted at certain consumers based on their biology. Maternity clothes are purposely advertised to pregnant females looking to consume based on their changing biological processes and female predisposition. The extent to which consumers are segmented and feel they are included or excluded in the segmentation in an ethical way makes this biological segmentation of growing interest for academics and marketers today. Various industries such as the insurance industry have been criticized to discriminate against consumers based on biology due to the use of genetic tests, where those with genetic diseases may have a higher premium. As scientists and marketers learn more about biology and gain greater access to consumer's biological information, ethical debates become increasingly apparent when engaging in marketing practices.

== Neuromarketing ==
Measuring consumers' conscious and subconscious through studying their biological sensorimotor, cognitive and affective response to marketing stimuli, called neuromarketing, is of increasing interest to marketers in order to gain insight into how they consume. Dawkins (1989) explained that when people die they leave behind genes and memes; genes being the unit of genetic information, and memes the units of cultural information. Neuromarketing aims to examine the memory of these memes in order to manipulate them.

Through fMRI, EEG, steady state topography (SST) and magnetoencephalography (MEG) scans, marketers are able to study how consumers react, as a step towards understanding how they can influence consumption through marketing efforts. In conjunction with qualitative research methods, it can provide deep understanding into what, how and why people consume. Measuring eye tracking in e-service marketing is another example of quantitative biological methods measuring the way people consume. It analyses how consumers shop in an online environment by recording the number of mouse clicks and click maps based on eye movement.

The famous Coke vs Pepsi study used fMRI scans to show consumers sensory taste preference to Pepsi to Coca-Cola. However, when participants were told they were drinking Coke, their brain activity also changed and they stated their preference for Coca-Cola. This shows that regardless of their biology and sensory reaction, people's consumption behaviour and preferences are influenced by the environment, in this case the perception of brands.
