= Innerscope Research =

US research firm

- Type: Private
- Industry: Market Research
- Founded: 2006
- Headquarters: Boston, USA
- Key people: Carl Marci; Brian Levine
- Products: Consumer research Market measurement
- Website: Innerscoperesearch.com

Innerscope Research was an integrated consumer neuroscience research firm that was acquired by Nielsen in 2015. Founded in 2006, Innerscope was based in Boston, Massachusetts with an office in New York City. Using applied neuroscience tools such as biometrics, eye tracking, facial coding as well as fMRI, often integrated with traditional measures of self-report, the company aims to measure in a more comprehensive way consumers’ non-conscious emotional connection to brands, products and services.

The company services Fortune 500 clients and works in multiple domains using a neuroscience informed framework (sometimes referred to as neuromarketing). Its research offering includes the evaluation of video advertising, shopper marketing, media platforms, online/mobile user experience as well as a variety of custom studies from testing fragrances to automobile driving experiences.

On May 27, 2015, Nielsen completed an acquisition of Innerscope Research and renamed its combined offering as Nielsen Consumer Neuroscience. Dr. Carl Marci was named Chief Neuroscientist.

== Projects ==
Innerscope annually studies the Super Bowl to identify which ads are most emotionally engaging – a far better predictor of success than traditional research methods. Each year, during television’s most watched event, Innerscope collects live biometric data to measure viewers’ non-conscious responses to advertisements with the goal of understanding advertising effectiveness and consumer behaviors. The results of its 2012 Super Bowl study were featured on CNN.

In 2014, Innerscope partnered with Time Warner Medialab and Temple University to conduct a study that allowed viewers to watch the Super Bowl in an environment that would resemble a live viewing of the sporting event. The research was designed to measure consumer engagement and media habits, using biometrics technology, in settings like a theater, a living room, a mock shopping area, and eye-tracking stations. The researchers then gave ads based on levels of biometric engagement to Temple University to measure the brain activity using fMRI (functional magnetic resonance imaging).

Innerscope also conducted research concerning path-to-purchase and consumer packaging with companies including Campbell's. The research firm’s work played a significant role in Campbell Soup Company redesigning its condensed soup label. The research looks at physiological responses such as perspiration and increased heart rate and marketing.

== History ==
The company was founded by Dr. Carl Marci and Brian Levine in 2006 who had worked at the MIT Media Lab.

On May 27, 2015, Nielsen completed an acquisition of Innerscope Research and renamed its combined offering as Nielsen Consumer Neuroscience. Dr. Carl Marci was named Chief Neuroscientist.
