= IULM University of Milan =

University in Milan, Italy

Coordinates: 45°26′34.08″N 9°9′51.13″E

IULM University - Milan
- Libera Università di Lingue e Comunicazione IULM
- Motto: Sapere, saper essere e saper fare
- Type: Private
- Established: 1968
- Rector: Gianni Canova
- Students: 4.313
- Location: Milan, Italy
- Campus: Milan and Rome
- Sports teams: CUS Milano (www.cusmilano.it)
- Website: www.iulm.it/

The IULM University - Milan (Italian: Libera Università di Lingue e Comunicazione IULM) is a university located in Milan, Italy. It was founded in 1968 and is organized in four faculties.

== History and profile ==
The University Institute for Modern Languages (IULM) was founded by Carlo Bo, poet, literary critic and professor of Spanish and French language and literature and Silvio Baridon, French language and literature professor at Bocconi University, in 1968. It was renamed in 1998, as the IULM University of Languages and Communication, to reflect its teaching of both languages and communication.

IULM University offers six three-year degree courses:

- Interpreting and Communication
- Corporate Communication and Public Relations
- Communication, Media and Advertising
- Tourism, Management and Territory
- Arts, Media, Cultural Events
- Fashion and Creative Industries

In addition to these three-year undergraduate degree courses, IULM University offers one- and two-year post-graduate degree courses, and also research doctorate schools.

Teaching staff include managers and professionals from media and communication, professional services, business, public administration and cultural organisations. Teaching is done through lectures, classroom activities and case studies, continuous assessment, internships in Italy and abroad and through international student exchanges.

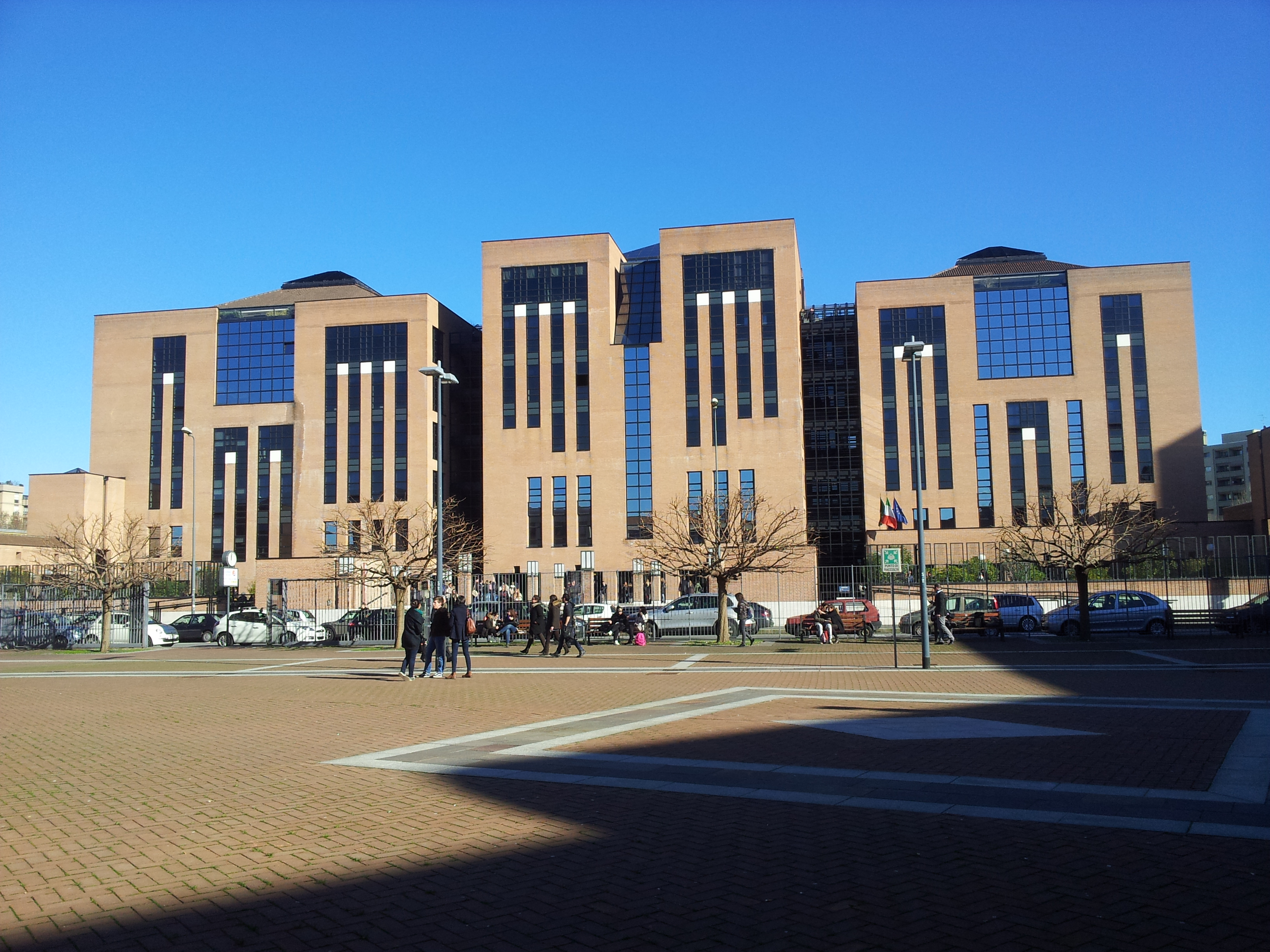
Main Building

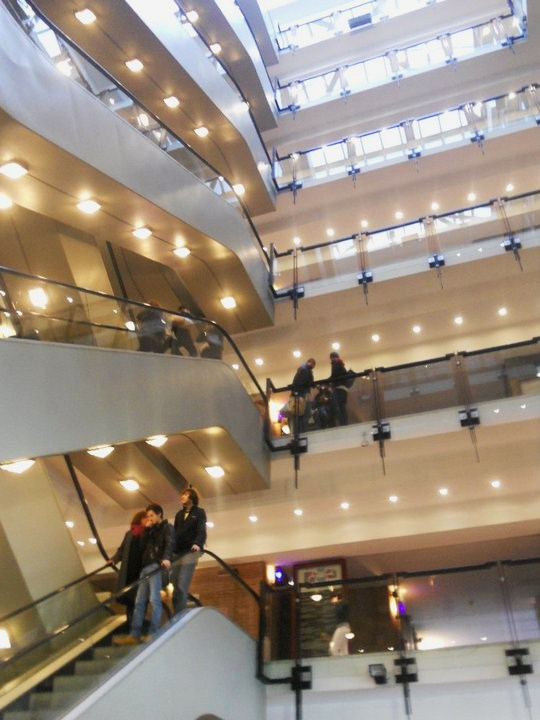
Entrance Hall

== Campus ==
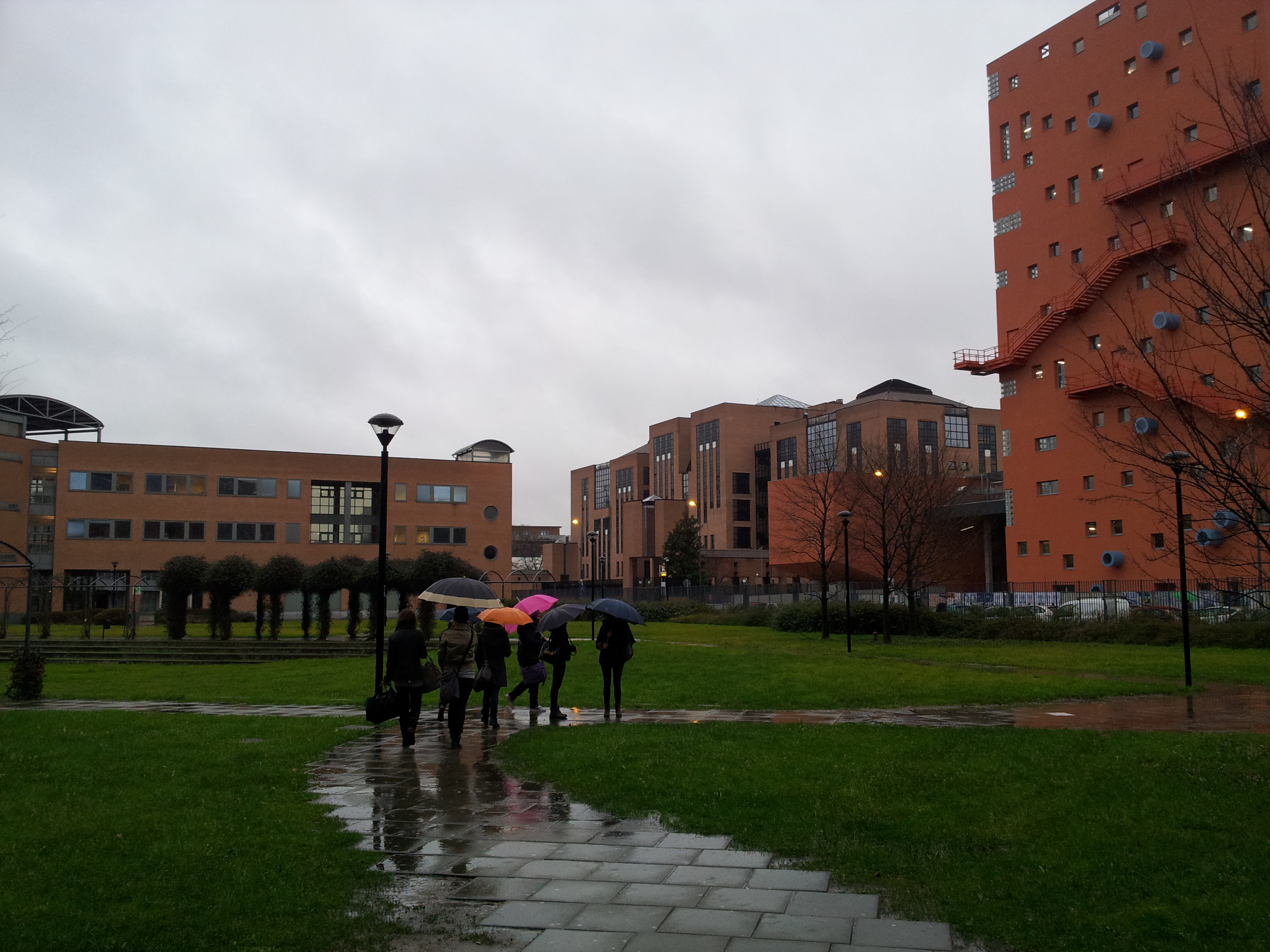
Building 2, building 1 and Knowledge Transfer Center

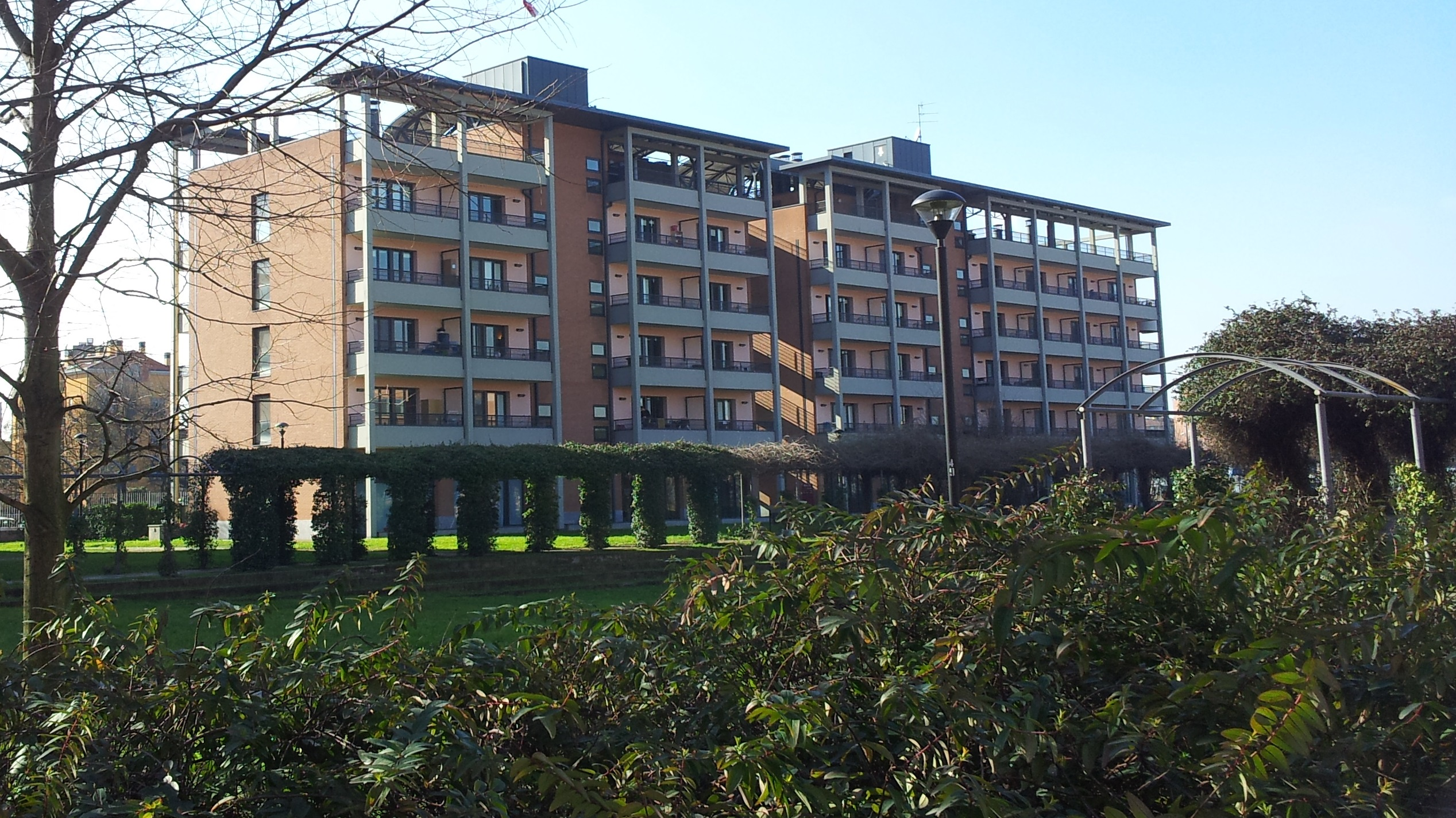
Student Housing

IULM University campus includes a study centre with modern teaching facilities.

The main building houses a reception desk, students’ admin. offices, the Dean’s office, the library and classrooms. New buildings have recently been added: a canteen catering for about 400 people, a building intended to become a research institute, an auditorium and a hall of residence.

== Organization ==
These are the 3 faculties in which the university is divided into:

- Faculty of Communication
- Faculty of Interpreting and Translation
- Faculty of Arts and Tourism

== Bachelor Programs ==
- Interpreting and Communication
- Corporate Communication and Public Relations
- Communication, Media and Advertising
- Tourism, Management and Territory
- Arts, Media, Cultural Events
- Fashion and Creative Industries

== Master's Degree Courses ==
- Specialised Translation and Conference Interpreting
- Marketing, Consumption and Communication
- Strategic Communication
- Artificial Intelligence for Business and Society
- Television, Cinema and New Media
- Hospitality and Tourism Management
- Arts, Valorisation and Markets

== University Master's Degree ==
- Arts of Storytelling. Literature, Cinema, Television
- Communication for International Relations (MICRI)
- Publishing and Music Production
- Food and Wine Communication (in collaboration with Gambero Rosso)
- Journalism
- International Tourism and Hospitality (MITH)
- Oriental Languages and Cultures
- Management of Made in Italy. Consumption and communication of fashion, design and luxury
- Management of Artistic and Cultural Resources
- Management and Communication of Beauty and Wellness
- Marketing and Communication of Sport
- Retail Brand & Customer Experience Management

== Specialist Master's Degree ==
- Art and Luxury Business
- Copywriting and advertising communication
- Dubbing, Adaptation and Translation of Cinetelevisual Works
- Gaming and eSports
- Cinema and series on audiovisual platforms: production, communication and programming
- International Marketing & Sales Communication
- Management and Communication of Events
- MasterBook, Master of specialization in the publishing professions
- Museology New Media and Museum Communication (On Line)
- Screenwriting

== Master's Executive ==
- Information Architecture and User Experience Design
- Behavioral Economics and Nudging
- Behavioral Sciences, choice architecture and change management
- Influencer Media Marketing
- Neuromarketing, Consumer Neuroscience and Market Research
- Corporate Public Relations (MARPI)
- Restaurant Business Management. Successful catering: from marketing strategies to operational management
- Social Media Marketing & Digital Communication

== Executive Course ==
- From BIG DATA to consumer neuroscience
- Design Thinking
- Fundamentals of consumer neuroscience
- Fundamentals of intuitive marketing and brain functioning
- Asset Management, directed by Professor Alessia Forloni
- Neuromarketing applied to digital
- Neuromarketing applied to advertising and packaging
- Measuring communication results
- The profession of the location manager
- Neuromarketing Research Methodology
- Neuroretail: neuromarketing in field, directed by the Professor Vincenzo Russo
- Principles of neuroeconomics and neurobranding
- Sensoriality, experiential and emotional marketing
- Marketing tools and augmented reality
- Corporate Reputation Management, launched in 2013 in collaboration with Andrea Barchiesi.

== Research doctorates ==
- Visual and Media Studies
- Communication, Markets and Society

== See also ==
- List of Italian universities
