= Kai-Markus Mueller =

Neuroscientist and entrepreneur

Kai-Markus Müller
- Born: Stuttgart, Germany
- Occupations: Neuroscientist, entrepreneur, and professor

Academic background
- Education: International Max Planck Research School

Academic work
- Discipline: Neuroscience
- Institutions: Hochschule Furtwangen University

Kai-Markus Müller is a German neuroscientist, entrepreneur, and professor. He is Professor of Consumer Behavior at HFU Business School in Villingen-Schwenningen, Germany. Müller previously acted as founder and CEO of The Neuromarketing Labs, a consumer neuroscience research company based in Aspach, Germany. He is known for having developed an EEG-based research technique for measuring willingness to pay. He is an alumnus of consulting firm Simon-Kucher.

== Education ==
Müller earned his PhD in neural and behavioral sciences in 2010 from the International Max Planck Research School in Tübingen for his dissertation research conducted at the National Institute of Mental Health.

== Selected works ==
- Müller, KM (2012). NeuroPricing - wie Kunden über Preise denken. Haufe Lexware. ISBN 978-3-648-03025-7.
- Hoefer, D; Handel, M; Müller, KM; Hammer, T (2016). "Electroencephalographic study showing that tactile stimulation by fabrics of different qualities elicit graded event-related potentials". Skin Research Technology. 22 (4): 1–9. doi:10.1111/srt.12288. PMID 26991667. S2CID 206309602.
- Herbes, C; Friege, C; Baldo, D; Müller, KM (2015). "Willingness to pay lip service? Applying a neuroscience-based method to WTP for green electricity". Energy Policy. 87: 562–572. Bibcode:2015EnPol..87..562H. doi:10.1016/j.enpol.2015.10.001.
- Baldo, D; Parikh, H; Piu, Y; Müller, KM (2015). "Brain waves predict success of new fashion products: A practical application for the footwear retailing industry". Journal of Creating Value. 1 (1): 61–71. doi:10.1111/srt.12288. PMID 26991667. S2CID 206309602.
- Müller, KM; Do, DH; Schillinger, F; Leopold, DA (2009). "Dissociable perceptual effects of visual adaptation". PLOS ONE. 4 (7) e6183. Bibcode:2009PLoSO...4.6183M. doi:10.1371/journal.pone.0006183. PMC 2703777. PMID 19593384.
- Müller, KM; Wilke, M; Leopold, DA (2009). "Visual adaptation to convexity in macaque area V4". Neuroscience. 161 (2): 655–662. doi:10.1016/j.neuroscience.2009.03.070. PMC 2724890. PMID 19345725.
- Wilke, M; Müller, KM; Leopold, DA (2009). "Neural activity in the visual thalamus reflects perceptual suppression". Proceedings of the National Academy of Sciences. 106 (23): 9465–9470. Bibcode:2009PNAS..106.9465W. doi:10.1073/pnas.0900714106. PMC 2684842. PMID 19458249.
- Osman, A; Müller, KM; Syre, P; Russ, B (2005). "Paradoxical lateralization of brain potentials during imagined foot movements". Cognitive Brain Research. 24 (3): 727–731. doi:10.1016/j.cogbrainres.2005.04.004. PMID 15894471.
