= Neuromanagement =

Part of cognitive neuroscience

Neuromanagement uses cognitive neuroscience, among other life science fields, and technology to analyze economic and managerial issues. It focuses on exploring human brain activities and mental processes when people are faced with typical problems of economics and management. This research provides insight into human decision-making and other general social behavior. The main research areas include decision neuroscience, neuroeconomics, neuromarketing, neuro-industrial engineering, and neuro-information systems. Neuromanagement was first proposed in 2006 by Professor Qingguo Ma, the director of Neuromanagement Laboratory of Zhejiang University.

== Decision neuroscience ==
Decision neuroscience consists of the following aspects:

- The neural basis of decision-making and behavioral preferences;
- the brain activities during decision-making process;
- the neural basis of game theory and game modeling.

== Neuromarketing ==
Neuromarketing derives from research on neural features of consumer behavior. Using neural activity to interpret consumer behavior provides insight into the neural mechanisms underlying different consumer decision-making behavior. Marketing experts can then determine what will encourage different consumers to make a purchase and produce appropriate marketing strategy, including general marketing, branding and how these relate to customer loyalty. Neuromarketing research is mainly composed of neuro-consumer behavior, neuro-marketing strategy and neuro-advertising.

== Neuro-industrial-engineering ==
The concept of neuro-industrial engineering was conceived by Qingguo Ma. It is an interdisciplinary subject of cognitive neuroscience and industrial engineering. Neuro-IE studies human cognition and uses advanced neuroscience and biofeedback technology to measure physiological responses in order to acquire data for further analysis, which provides insight into people's mental states without subjective consciousness control. Then this data, people's neuro activities with physiological and psychological states in the production process, are applied to operations management to improve processes for workers.

== Neuro-Information-Systems (NeuroIS) ==
The concept of Neuro-Information-Systems (NeuroIS) was formally proposed at the 2007 International Conference on Information Systems (ICIS). The proposal discussed four major opportunities for the application of cognitive theory, methods and techniques on information system issues, particularly in technology adoption and application, e-commerce and group decision support systems. Subsequently, the study of NeuroIS has been published in MIS Quarterly, Information Systems Research, as well as presented at ICIS and Americas Conference on Information Systems.

== Neuro-entrepreneurship ==
This incorporates the interior characteristics of the entrepreneurs to study the neural basis of innovation. More important, neuroentrepreneurship focuses on what if often called the "entrepreneurial mindset" by looking at "what lies beneath" more surface level entrepreneurial thinking such as intentions. Neuroentrepreneurship thus offers new insights into understanding what happens in experiential learning as is essential in entrepreneurship education.

== Neuromanagement Lab ==
Neuromanagement Lab was established in 2006 as one of the first labs established in China specialized in researches elucidating the micro-mechanisms of management activities in an interdisciplinary field integrating management science, economics, and cognitive neuroscience. The lab is located at Zhejiang University and equipped with standard cognitive neuroscience and behavioral experiment rooms. The lab has recently focused on researches on interdisciplinary fields including Decision Neuroscience, Neuroeconomics, Neuromanagement, Neural-Industrial Engineering, Neuromarketing, and Social neuroscience.

The Lab has undertaken over 30 national, ministerial or provincial-level projects since establishment. The project on Neuromarketing and the project on decision-making (both sponsored by the National Social Science Foundation of China) were the first projects approved in their academic fields. Moreover, the lab has hosted approximately 10 high-level academic symposiums, including the International Conference on Neuromanagement and Neuroeconomics.

== See also ==
- Consumer neuroscience
- Neuromarketing
