= SST =

SST may refer to:

== Arts and entertainment ==
- SST: Death Flight, a 1977 disaster movie
- SST: Salo-Salo Together, a former Philippine TV show
- Stadium Super Trucks, American racing series

=== Music ===
- S.S.T. Band (Sega Sound Team), a Japanese music band
- SST Records, an independent record label
- "S.S.T." (song), song by Prince

== Organizations ==
- SST Inc., also known as ShotSpotter Inc.
- School of Science and Technology, high school in Oregon, US
- School of Science and Technology, Singapore
- Sensible Sentencing Trust, New Zealand
- Silicon Storage Technology, Inc, former US semiconductor manufacturer
- Special Security Team, a counter-terrorist unit of the Japanese Coast Guard

== Athletes ==
- Sara Sorribes Tormo, Spanish tennis player
- Samoan SWAT Team, professional wrestling tag team

== Science and technology ==
- SST (Menter’s Shear Stress Transport), a model used in fluid dynamics
- Solid-state Technology deployed in every Solid-state battery
- Salt spray test, a method of measuring corrosion resistance of materials and surface coatings
- Sea surface temperature
- Sea surface topography
- Serum-separating tube, used in venipuncture
- Socioemotional selectivity theory, a life-span theory of motivation
- Solid-state transformer, a type of transformer
- Somatostatin, a peptide hormone
- Stainless steel (a symbol for stainless steel on engineering drawings as per Y14.38–2007)
- Steady state topography, a research methodology in cognitive neuroscience and neuromarketing
- Super Sound Tracing, a demodulation technique for FM tuners by Sony
- Total sum of squares, in statistics
- Small Sugary Treat, a liquid form of Sucrose used in behavioural studies of animals

=== Computing ===
- Single Stream Transport, used by DisplayPort
- Structured Stream Transport, MIT data transport protocol

=== Telescopes ===
- Solar Submillimeter Telescope, located in the "El Leoncito" Astronomical Complex
- Space Surveillance Telescope, a military telescope located at Exmouth, Western Australia.
- Spitzer Space Telescope, NASA infrared space observatory
- Swedish Solar Telescope

== Time ==
- Samoa Standard Time or Samoa Time Zone
- Singapore Standard Time

== Transportation ==
- SST class blimp
- Supersonic transport, aircraft
- Training Submarines, (US Navy hull classification symbol: SST)
- Mitsubishi SST, a concept car by Mitsubishi
- Twin Clutch SST, a twin-clutch transmission developed by Mitsubishi
- Safe Secure Trailer, see US Office of Secure Transportation
- SST, the National Rail station code for Stansted Mountfitchet railway station, Essex, England

== Other uses ==
- Seed Science and Technology, a journal about seed science published by the International Seed Testing Association
- SST (typeface)
- Swiss Solvency Test, a framework for the regulation of the insurance industry in Switzerland
- Serious Sam: Tormental, a video game by Gungrounds
- Sales and Services Tax, a type of tax in Malaysia
