= Gianni Canova =

Italian film critic (born 1954)

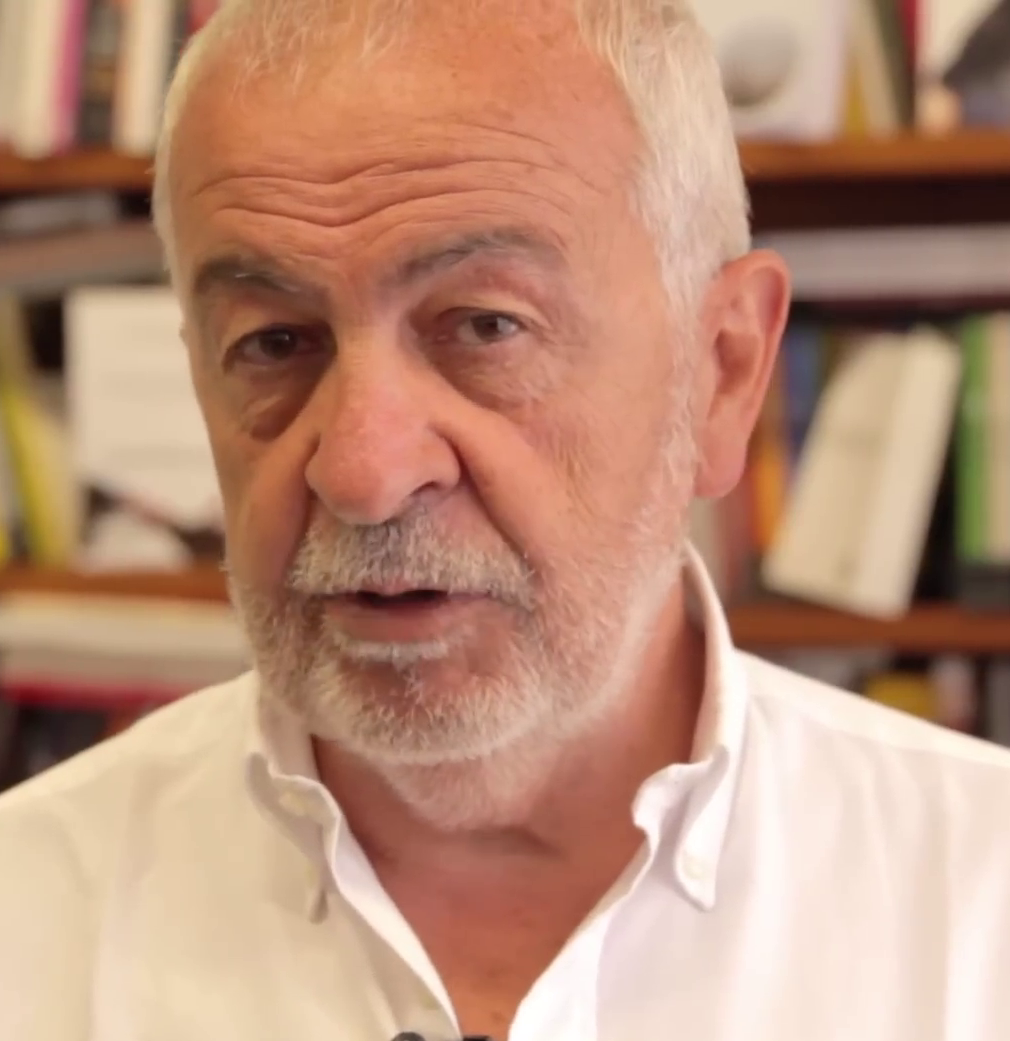
- Born: Gian Battista Canova; 16 February 1954 (age 72); Castione della Presolana, Bergamo, Italy
- Occupation: Film critic

Gian Battista "Gianni" Canova (born 16 February 1954) is an Italian film critic, essayist, television writer and academic.

== Life and career ==
Born in Castione della Presolana, Canova graduated in letters from the University of Milan. In 1993 he founded the film journal Duel (later renamed Duellanti), also serving as editor until 2011. In 2012, he founded the magazine 8 ½. As a film critic, he also collaborated with important publications such as La Repubblica, Rolling Stone, Bianco e Nero, il Manifesto, Vogue, Sette, La Voce. He also collaborates with Sky Cinema, for which he created the program Il Cinemaniaco.

Canova is professor of film history and filmology at the IULM University of Milan, and from 2018 he also serves as rector. In 2024, he was named president of the Scientific Committee of the Centro Sperimentale di Cinematografia Foundation.
