= Steady state topography =

Method for studying brain activity

In neuroimaging, steady state topography (SST) is a methodology for observing and measuring human brain activity that was first described by Richard Silberstein and co-workers in 1990. While SST has been principally used as a cognitive neuroscience research methodology, it has also found commercial application in the field of neuromarketing and consumer neuroscience in such areas as brand communication, media research and entertainment.

In a typical SST study, brain electrical activity (electroencephalogram or EEG) is recorded while participants view audio visual material and/or perform a psychological task. Simultaneously, a dim sinusoidal visual flicker is presented in the visual periphery. The sinusoidal flicker elicits an oscillatory brain electrical response known as the Steady State Visually Evoked Potential (SSVEP). Task related changes in brain activity in the vicinity of the recording site are then determined from SSVEP measurements at that site. One of the most important features of the SST methodology is the ability to measure variations in the delay (latency) between the stimulus and the SSVEP response over extended periods of time. This offers a unique window into brain function based on neural processing speed as opposed to the more common EEG amplitude indicators of brain activity.

Three specific features of the SST methodology make it a useful technique in cognitive neuroscience research as well as neuroscience-based communication research.

1. High temporal resolution: the SST methodology is able to continuously track rapid changes in brain activity over an extended period of time. This is an important feature as many changes in brain function associated with a cognitive task can occur in less than a second.

2. High signal-to-noise ratio and resistance to interference and 'noise'. The SST methodology is able to tolerate high levels of noise or interference due to such things as head movements, muscle tension, blinks and eye movements. This makes SST well suited to cognitive studies where eye, head and body movements occur as a matter of course.

3. The high signal-to-noise ratio means that it is possible to work with data based on a single trial per individual as opposed to the typical situation encountered in event-related potential (ERP) or event related fMRI studies where there is a need to average multiple trials recorded from each individual to achieve adequate signal-to-noise ratio levels.

== Main paradigm ==
In applying the SST methodology audio visual material is presented simultaneously with a peripheral, spatially diffuse visual flicker and Fourier techniques are used to extract the amplitude and the phase of the SSVEP at the stimulus frequency. When the stimulus frequency is in the alpha frequency range (8 Hz – 13 Hz), the SSVEP can be recorded from the occipital region and also from other 'non-visual' regions such as the frontal and prefrontal cortex and the temporal and parietal cortex. Most SST studies use a visual stimulus in the upper alpha frequency range (10 Hz – 13 Hz) or gamma frequency range (30 Hz – 100 Hz) to elicit the SSVEP. Changes in the SSVEP amplitude and phase coinciding with a cognitive task or other material such as a television advertisement are then interpreted as changes in regional brain activity associated with the cognitive task. SSVEP amplitude changes are interpreted in a similar fashion to changes in upper alpha EEG amplitude while changes in SSVEP phase are expressed as changes in SSVEP latency. An SSVEP latency reduction is interpreted physiologically as increased synaptic excitation in the neural networks generating the SSVEP implying increased regional brain activity and vice versa.

== Scientific and biomedical applications ==
The SST methodology has been used to examine normal brain function associated with visual vigilance, working memory, long-term memory, emotional processes, as well as disturbed brain functions such as schizophrenia and attention deficit hyperactivity disorder

== Commercial applications ==
The SST methodology has been applied commercially in areas such as consumer neuroscience, neuromarketing, media and entertainment research. In this application area SST is used to measure second by second changes in brain activity associated with a wide range of communication media. By measuring brain activity at a number of scalp locations it is possible to estimate second by second changes in a number of relevant psychological parameters including, Long-term Memory Encoding, Engagement (sense of personal relevance), Motivational Valence (whether the material attracts or repels the viewer) as well as Emotional Intensity (arousal) and Visual Attention. Research indicates that a major SST indicator of advertising effectiveness is the level of long-term memory encoding of the key message or the brand in the advertisement.

Twitter inc famously used SST technology to explore and test the power of the platform.
