= Gemma Calvert =

British neuroscientist

Gemma A. Calvert FRSA
- Education: London School of Economics; University of Oxford
- Scientific career
- Fields: Neuroscience, neuromarketing
- Workplaces: Neurosense Limited; Split Second Research; Nanyang Technological University
- Thesis: Functional magnetic resonance imaging studies of lip-reading and audio-visual speech perception (1997)
- Website: gemmacalvert.com

Gemma A. Calvert is a British neuroscientist and pioneer of neuromarketing. She is the founder of Neurosense Limited, the world's first neuromarketing agency established in 1999, and in 2016 she co-founded Split Second Research, a company which provides implicit research for companies worldwide. Calvert is a professor of marketing at the Nanyang Business School at the Nanyang Technological University in Singapore.

== Biography ==
Calvert spent her childhood in the United States and Malaysia. She is the daughter of Michael John Calvert, an HSBC banker who was brought up in China during the Second World War. She attended the Alice Smith School in Kuala Lumpur until 1978 before attending Wycombe Abbey in High Wycombe, Buckinghamshire in the United Kingdom.

Her early career was spent as an account executive for marketing consultancy firm, Francis Killingbeck Bain (FKB) before pursuing a degree in social psychology at the London School of Economics. She completed her DPhil in clinical medicine at the University of Oxford in 1997 under the supervision of Susan Iversen and Tim Crow. Her thesis was the first Oxford doctorate to be awarded using functional magnetic resonance imaging (fMRI) to study human brain function. Recognising the potential applicability of this new brain imaging technology for understanding the subconscious biases and influences that characterise consumer behaviour, in 1999 she co-founded Neurosense Limited – a company specialising in the application of fMRI and psychological tools to marketing – with Professor Michael Brammer and Dr Peter Hansen.

She was awarded a medical research fellowship in 1998 and Wellcome Trust Career Development Award in 2001 and was based at the University of Oxford's departments of psychology, physiology and the Functional Magnetic Resonance Imaging of the Brain Centre (FMRIB) until 2004 when she took up a tenured readership at the University of Bath. In 2008, she was appointed to a tenured chair in applied neuroscience at the Warwick Manufacturing Group, University of Warwick.

In 2010, she took up the position as managing director of Neurosense Limited, a neuromarketing company she founded in 1999. In 2008 she was appointed as a fellow of the Royal College for Arts and Business and in 2012, elected to the Global Agenda Council for Neuroscience and Behaviour at the World Economic Forum.

== Research ==
Over the last 20 years, Calvert has published more than 50 peer-reviewed scientific papers and co-authored the Handbook of Multisensory Processes.

Her early research represents some of the seminal work on human brain functional using functional magnetic resonance imaging (fMRI) and particularly how the senses combine in the brain. She published her first academic paper, on how silent lip-reading activates the auditory cortex, in Science, while she was a doctoral student. This finding and her subsequent research on multisensory brain systems explored how the different sensory systems interact in the brain and influence behaviour at the subconscious level.

In addition to her academic research, she has conducted commercial brain imaging studies for many multinational companies. She has appeared on many television and radio programmes including CNN, 60 Minutes, BBC Secrets of the Superbrands series, BBC World Business, BBC Inside Out, France 5, BBC World Service Business Daily and Science Now, BBC Radio 4 In our Time with Melvyn Bragg, and National Public Radio. Her research on the power of the subconscious brain and its applicability to marketing and manufacturing has also been covered by Time, The Economist, Newsweek, Wired, The Sunday Times, The Guardian and The Straits Times.
