= Neuro-Information-Systems =

Neuro-Information-Systems (NeuroIS) is a subfield of the information systems (IS) discipline, which relies on neuroscience and neurophysiological knowledge and tools to better understand the development, use, and impact of information and communication technologies. The field has been formally established at the International Conference on Information Systems (ICIS) in 2007.

== Aims and scope ==
Research evidence supports the idea that human behavior is influenced by individual factors (e.g., genetic predisposition) and environmental factors. These influences affect the brain (e.g., its structure and processing mechanisms) which subsequently impacts the way in which information is processed. By acknowledging this relationship of individual characteristics (e.g., experiences with e-commerce platforms that have led to changes in the brain due to learning processes), environmental influences (e.g., characteristics of an IT artifact such as the usability of an e-commerce platform) and human behavior (e.g., purchasing behavior in an e-commerce context), NeuroIS seeks to understand the internal processes that are involved in the formation of human behavior related to information systems. By applying theories and tools from neuroscience and related fields, NeuroIS strives to make a number of important contributions, including but not limited to:

- Inform the design of IT artifacts and IS investigations in general
- Introduce a biological level of analysis as mediator between IT artifact and IT behavior
- Shed light on theoretical mechanisms underlying the influence of the IT artifact on IT behavior
- Offer additional avenues for IT artifact evaluation (e.g., using brain activity)
- Enable the measurement of constructs that cannot be reliably measured using self-report techniques (e.g., questionnaires, interviews)
- Offer additional predictive power for certain outcome variables (e.g., user health)
- Enable investigations into how physiology (e.g., brain structure) is affected by the use of IT artifacts
- Offer additional input for adaptive systems (e.g., based on real-time assessments of physiological well-being)
- Offer additional input for users to reflect on their behavior (e.g., biofeedback)
- Offer additional input for human-computer interaction (e.g., brain-computer interfaces for physically-impaired individuals)

Applying theories and tools from neuroscience, NeuroIS also draws from other reference disciplines and shares a close connection with sister disciplines that have also added these theories and instruments to their set of methods. Reference disciplines and sister disciplines for NeuroIS include, but are not limited to:

- Neuropyschology and Cognitive Neuroscience
- Neuroeconomics, Decision Neuroscience and Social Neuroscience
- Neuromarketing and Consumer Neuroscience
- Neuroergonomics
- Affective Computing and Brain-Computer Interaction

== Data collection methods ==
Two commonly used types of neurophysiological data collection methods are applied in NeuroIS research:

- Psychophysiological tools that focus on the capture of activity related to the autonomic nervous system and
- Brain imaging tools that focus on the capture of activity in the central nervous system.

=== Psychophysiological tools ===
The most commonly used psychophysiological tools in NeuroIS include the measurement of eye gaze behavior and pupil dilation (eye tracking), the measurement of electrodermal activity (skin conductance response), the measurement of muscular activity (electromyography) and the measurement of heart-related activity (electrocardiogram).

=== Brain imaging tools ===
The main brain imaging tools that are used in NeuroIS include functional magnetic resonance imaging (fMRI) and Electroencephalography (EEG).

== Conferences and groups ==
Since 2009 an annual conference is taking place in Austria to support NeuroIS research. From 2009 to 2017 this conference has been called the Gmunden Retreat on NeuroIS and took place in Gmunden, Austria. Since 2018, it is being called the NeuroIS Retreat and takes place in Vienna, Austria.

In 2018, a society called the NeuroIS Society has been founded in Austria to further support the growth of the field and the collaboration amongst NeuroIS researchers.
