= Andrea Barchiesi =

Electronic engineer, CEO of Reputation Manager company

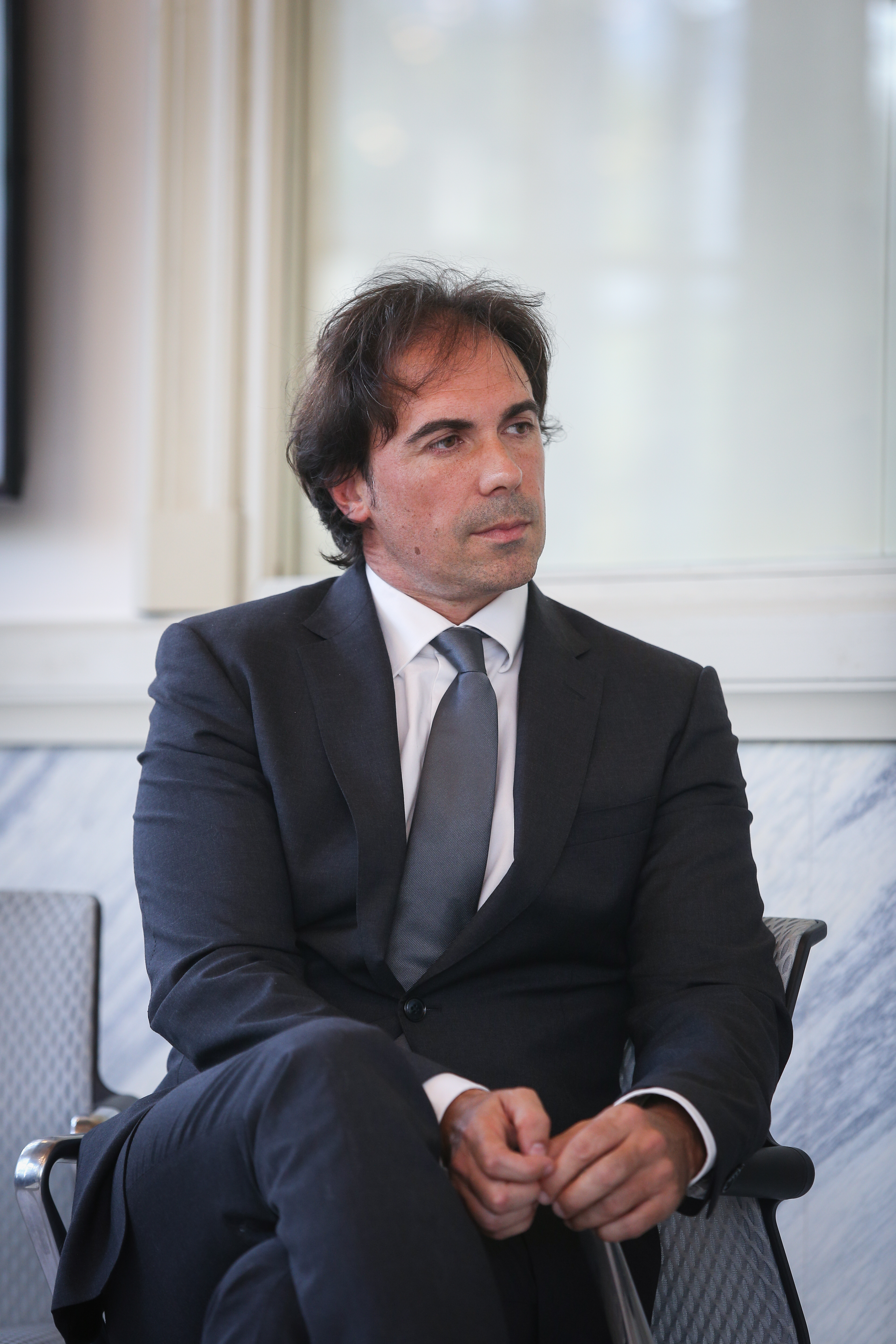
- Andrea Barchiesi
- Occupation: CEO

Andrea Barchiesi (born in 1971) is an electronic engineer, founder, and CEO of Reputation Manager, an Italian company specialising in the analysis, management, and construction of the online reputation of companies, brands, institutions, and prominent public figures.

== Career ==
After obtaining his degree in Electronic Engineering in 1998, Andrea Barchiesi embarked on his career at Accenture, where he was involved in technological, organisational, and strategic consulting for client companies. In 2004, he founded Reputation Manager, an Italian company specialising in the analysis, management, and construction of the online reputation of companies, brands, institutions, and prominent public figures. He also outlined the foundations of Reputational Engineering, a scientific methodology that enables the governance of the entire digital ecosystem related to a subject.

In 2012, he developed the innovative TV program “Reputescion”, the first dedicated to scientifically evaluating an individual's online reputation. Hosted by Andrea Scanzi, the program aired throughout 2012 and the following years on the La3 TV channel, featuring prominent figures from the worlds of politics, culture, society, and entertainment. The analyses conducted during the program were coordinated by Reputation Manager.

In 2013, in collaboration with the IULM University of Milan, he launched the first Master's program in Reputation Management in Italy, later taking on the role of Digital Consultant for the Italian Ministry of Health from 2013 to 2017. A member of the Communication Steering Committee for AGENAS - Italian Agency for Regional Health Services since 2015, the following year he became Responsible for the technical development of activities offered by the “Sportello help web reputation giovani” of Co.Re.Com. Lombardia, as well as for informative and educational projects for students, parents, and teachers in secondary schools in Lombardy. He led a similar project for Co.Re.Com Abruzzo from 2017 to 2019 and for Co.Re.Com Veneto from 2019.

Starting in 2017, Andrea Barchiesi was responsible for the conception, technical development, and management of the “Fake Content Mitigation” project on behalf of the Italian Ministry of Health. The project was dedicated to the direct online counteraction of false information on citizens’ health. In 2018, together with Auro Palomba, he co-founded Reputation Science and assumed the role of CEO.

Among his current activities, he is also a professor in Master's programs and university courses, in addition to collaborating with various national newspapers. Since 2016, he has been contributing to “Prima Comunicazione”, by writing a monthly column, “Spiaggia Libera”, where he conducts analyses and offers insights on digital topics and their impact on social and communication aspects.

Since 2018, he has also been collaborating with the newspaper “L’Economia - Corriere della Sera”, for which he writes a monthly column dedicated to the “Top Manager Reputation” permanent observatory, the first in Italy specifically focused on the online reputation of top managers.

In October 2024, he published “Ingegneria Reputazionale. Comprendere, misurare e costruire la reputazione” (“Reputational Engineering. Understanding, measuring, and shaping reputation”), edited by FrancoAngeli. The book, intended for communication and marketing professionals, top executives, public figures, and institutions, explores his theory of Reputational Engineering, developed through years of research applied to major brands and the dynamics influencing their online perception.

== Awards ==
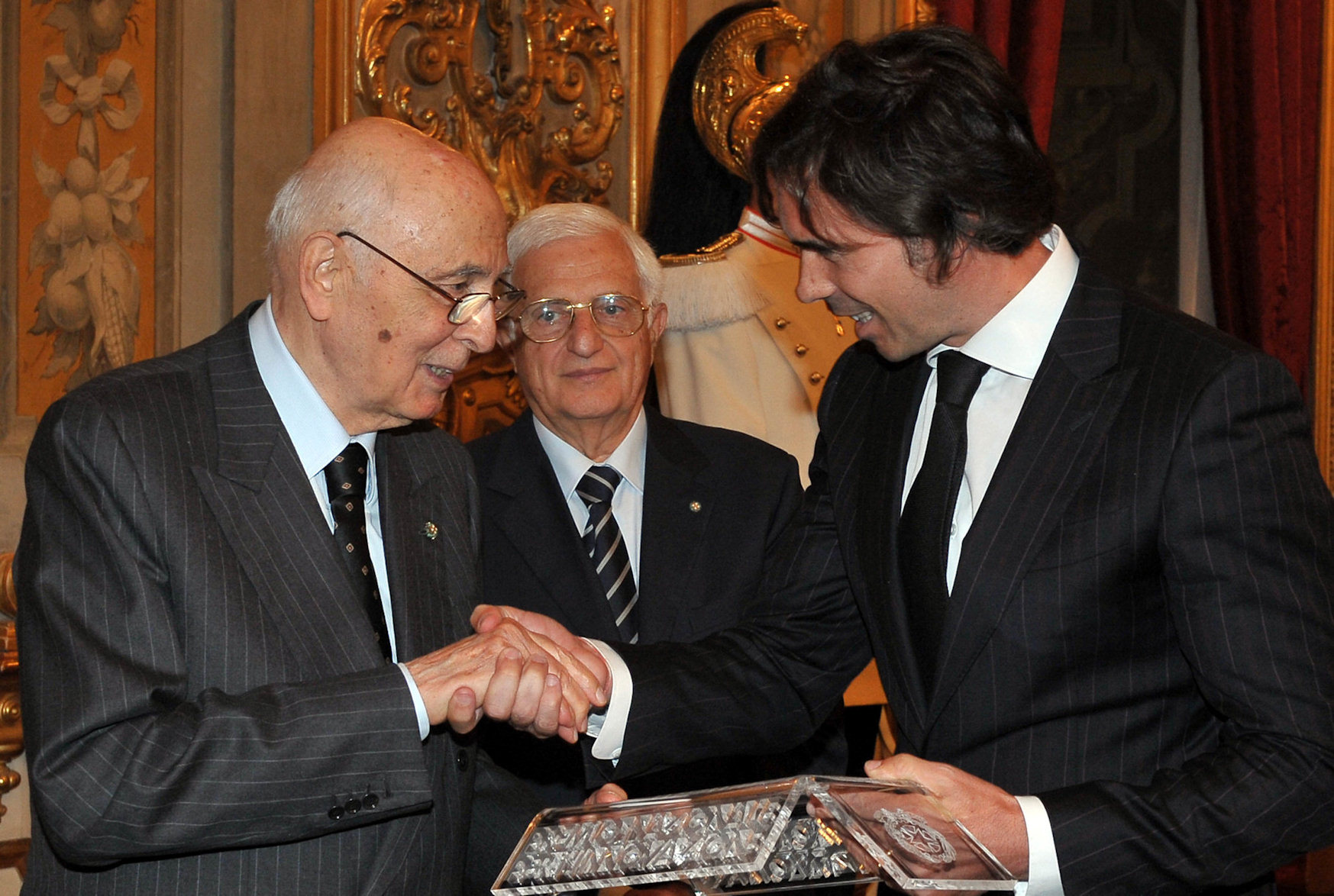
National Innovation Award conferred by Giorgio Napolitano to Andrea Barchiesi

- In 2011, Andrea Barchiesi was awarded the National Innovation Award by the President of the Italian Republic, Giorgio Napolitano.
- In 2018, he was honored with the Adriano Olivetti Award.

== Publications ==
- Barchiesi, Andrea; Sagrillo, Felix (2012). Web intelligence & psicolinguistica. La dimensione emotiva nascosta del linguaggio on line applicata al marketing e alla comunicazione. FrancoAngeli. ISBN 9788820410308.
- Barchiesi, Andrea (2016). La tentazione dell'oblio. Vuoi subire o costruire la tua identità digitale?. FrancoAngeli. ISBN 9788891725516.
- Barchiesi, Andrea; Buccirossi, Paolo; Previti, Stefano; Sanzari, Flaviano (2019). Ferrario, Ivo (ed.). Marca, Internet e contrasto alla disinformazione. Tutelare il Brand, affrontare la crisi, quantificare il danno. Centromarca.
- Barchiesi, Andrea; Previti, Stefano; Sanzari, Flaviano (2019). Web reputation e identità aziendale online: strumenti di tutela. Giuffrè. ISBN 9788828815471.
- Barchiesi, Andrea (2024). Ingegneria Reputazionale. Comprendere, misurare e costruire la reputazione. FrancoAngeli. ISBN 9788835161615.

== See also ==
- Reputation
- Reputation management
- Online identity
- Digital identity
- Brand management
