= Carl Marci =

American neuroscientist (born 1969)

Dr. Carl D. Marci
- Born: April 26, 1969 (age 57)
- Education: Columbia University (BS); Oxford University (MA); Harvard University (MD)
- Occupations: Physician, Scientist, Entrepreneur
- Website: https://rewiredthebook.com/

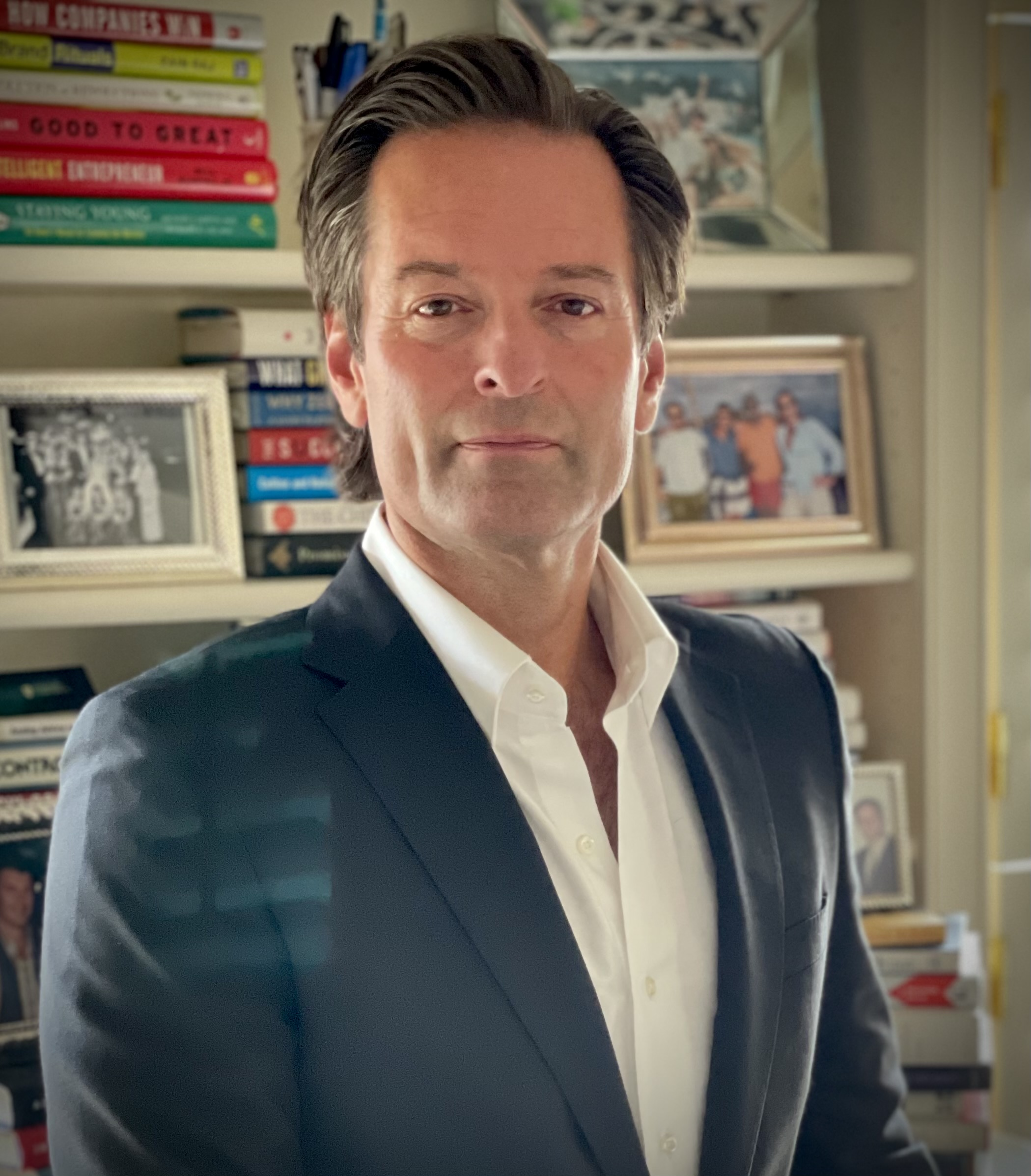
Dr. Carl D. Marci

Carl D. Marci (born April 26, 1969) is a physician, scientist, entrepreneur and author of the book, Rewired: Protecting Your Brain in the Digital Age. He is currently fractional Chief Medical Officer at a number of venture-backed health technology companies using artificial intelligence to improve patient outcomes. He is also a part-time psychiatrist within the Department of Psychiatry at Massachusetts General Hospital, and Assistant Professor of Psychiatry at Harvard Medical School.

== Biography and academic career ==
Marci received his B.A. in psychology at Columbia University, M.A. in psychology and philosophy at St Catherine's College, Oxford as a Rhodes Scholar, and then completed his M.D. at Harvard Medical School. He had further training in biometrics and the neuroscience of emotion through two National Institute of Health fellowships.

His early work focused on physiologic concordance or synchrony between patients and doctors as an indicator of empathy. One study, published in the Journal of Nervous and Mental Disease found a relationship between high levels of physiologic concordance and empathy in a clinical population.

Later in his career, he was inspired by the birth of his three children and the relationship between growing use of mobile media, information and communications devices and rising rates of mental illness among young people. This led him to write and publish his first book, Rewired: Protecting Your Brain in the Digital Age (Harvard University Press, 2022).

== Business career ==
Dr. Carl Marci is currently Chief Medical Officer at a number of venture back early stage health-technology companies including Predictably Human, Cerebral, Menssano and OM1. Prior to joining OM1, he was Chief Psychiatrist at Ready Responders, a venture-backed in-home urgent care health delivery company and Chief Medical Officer for CompanionMx, a digital health technology company with a clinically-proven platform for proactive mobile mental health monitoring, dedicated to preventing mental health episodes.

His entrepreneurial career started when Marci co-founded Innerscope Research, a pioneer in the field of consumer neuroscience, in 2006. From 2008 to 2013, he served as CEO. In 2015, Innerscope Research was acquired by Nielsen, where he served as the global Chief Neuroscientist for Nielsen Consumer Neuroscience. The Nielsen division is a provider of consumer based neuroscience using electroencephalography (EEG), biometrics, and other technologies for measuring non-conscious processes related to media and marketing. His work there on researching the emotions of Super Bowl advertising have been featured nationally on Good Morning America, CNN, MSNBC, and Fox News.

Marci is also the Chairperson of the Board of Advisors and a member of the Executive Committee for the Endowment for the Advancement of Psychotherapy in the Department of Psychiatry at Massachusetts General Hospital and the former Chairman of the Board for Beyond Conflict, a non-profit that uses brain and behavioral sciences to tackle challenging social issues, including dehumanization, polarization and racism.

== Other accomplishments ==
Marci has presented at conferences sponsored by the Advertising Research Foundation, Association of National Advertisers, the Cable & Telecommunications Association for Marketing, the World Advertising Research Conference, ESOMAR, and the Festival of Media Global Event. He has published articles in peer-reviewed science journals, and was a guest editor of Media Magazine and the International Journal of Advertising Special Issue on Advertising and the Brain. Marci was awarded the 2016 Marketing Technology Trailblazer by AdAge, named one of the PharmaVoice100 Leaders shaping the future of healthcare, and the 2024 winner of the Marconi Science Award. He is also a member of the Aspen Global Leadership Network as a 2014 Henry Crown Fellow.
