= Journal of Creating Value =

- Discipline: Business & Management
- Language: English
- Edited by: Moshe Davidow

Publication details
- History: June 2015
- Publisher: SAGE Publications
- Frequency: Bi-annually

Standard abbreviations
- ISO 4: J. Creat. Value

Indexing
- ISSN: 2394-9643 (print); 2454-213X (web)

Links
- Journal homepage; Online access; Online archive

The Journal of Creating Value is a peer reviewed academic journal that focusses on creating value for customers and in turn creating value for the company and its stakeholders. Gautam Mahajan, CEO Customer Value Foundation is the founding editor of the Journal.

The Journal provides a platform for information and debate on the new concepts of Customer-led management practices.
