= Neuromarketing =

Marketing communication field

Neuromarketing is a commercial marketing communication field that applies neuropsychology to market research, studying consumers' sensorimotor, cognitive, and affective responses to marketing stimuli. The potential benefits to marketers include more efficient and effective marketing campaigns and strategies, fewer product and campaign failures, and ultimately the manipulation of the real needs and wants of people to suit the needs and wants of marketing interests.

Certain companies, particularly those with large-scale ambitions to predict consumer behavior, have invested in their own laboratories, science personnel, or partnerships with academia. Neuromarketing is still an expensive approach; it requires advanced equipment and technology such as magnetic resonance imaging (MRI), motion capture for eye-tracking, and the electroencephalogram. Given the amount of new learnings from neuroscience and marketing research, marketers have begun applying neuromarketing best practices without needing to engage in expensive testing.

== History ==
Neuromarketing is an emerging disciplinary field in marketing. It borrows tools and methodologies from fields such as neuroscience and psychology. The term "neuromarketing" was introduced by different authors in 2002 (cf. infra) but research in the field can be found from the 1990s.

Gerald Zaltman is associated with one of the first experiments in neuromarketing. In the late 1990s, both Gemma Calvert (UK) and Gerald Zaltman (US) had established consumer neuroscience companies. Marketing professor Gerald Zaltman patented the Zaltman metaphor elicitation technique (ZMET) in the 1990s to sell advertising. ZMET explored the human subconscious with specially selected sets of images that cause a positive emotional response and activate hidden images, metaphors stimulating the purchase. Graphical collages were constructed on the base of detected images, which lays in the basis for commercials. ZMET quickly gained popularity among hundreds of major companies-customers including Coca-Cola, General Motors, Nestle, and Procter & Gamble. Zaltman and his associates were employed by those organizations to investigate brain scans and observe the neural activity of consumers. In 1999, he began to use functional magnetic resonance imaging (fMRI) to show correlations between consumer brain activity and marketing stimuli. Zaltman's marketing research methods enhanced psychological research used in marketing tools.

The term "neuromarketing" was first published in 2002 in the Master Thesis of Associate Professor Philippe Morel, then a student at the Ecole Nationale supérieure d'architecture de Paris-Belleville. The chapter "Capitalism II : Infocapitalism (experience)" contains a development with sub-chapter Hyper-rational Anticipation: Neuroscience and Neuromarketing. The same year, the term "neuromarketing" was published in an article by BrightHouse (after contacting Ass. Pr. Morel about this topic), a marketing firm based in Atlanta and used by Dutch marketing professor Ale Smidts. BrightHouse sponsored neurophysiologic (nervous system functioning) research into marketing divisions; they constructed a business unit that used fMRI scans for market research purposes. The firm rapidly attracted criticism and disapproval concerning conflict of interest with Emory University, who helped establish the division. This enterprise disappeared from public attention and now works with over 500 clients and consumer-product businesses. The "Pepsi Challenge", a blind taste test of Coca-Cola and Pepsi, was a study conducted in 2004 that brought attention to neuromarketing. In 2006, Dr. Carl Marci (US) founded Innerscope Research that focused on Neuromarketing research. Innerscope research was later acquired by the Nielsen Corporation in May 2015 and renamed Nielsen Consumer Neuroscience. Unilever's Consumer Research Exploratory Fund (CREF) had also published white papers on the potential applications of neuromarketing.

== Concept ==
Collecting information on how the target market would respond to a product is the first step involved for organisations advertising a product. Traditional methods of marketing research include focus groups or sizeable surveys used to evaluate features of the proposed product. Some of the conventional research techniques used in this type of study are the measurement of cardiac electrical activity (ECG) and electrical activity of the dermis (EDA) of subjects. However, it results in an incompatibility between market research findings and the actual behavior exhibited by the target market at the point of purchase. Human decision-making is both a conscious and non-conscious process in the brain, and while this method of research succeeded in gathering explicit (or conscious) emotions, it failed to gain the consumer's implicit (or unconscious) emotions. Non-conscious information has a large influence in the decision-making process.

The concept of neuromarketing combines marketing, psychology and neuroscience. Research is conducted around the implicit motivations to understand consumer decisions by non-invasive methods of measuring brain activity. These include electroencephalography (EEG), magnetoencephalography (MEG), and functional magnetic resonance imaging (fMRI), eye tracking, electrodermal response measures and other neuro-technologies. Researchers investigate and learn how consumers respond and feel when presented with products and/or related stimuli. Observations can then be correlated with the participants' surmised emotions and social interactions. Market researchers use this information to determine if products or advertisements stimulate responses in the brain linked with positive emotions. The concept of neuromarketing was therefore introduced to study relevant human emotions and behavioral patterns associated with products, ads and decision-making. Neuromarketing provides models of consumer behavior and can also be used to re-interpret extant research. It provides theorization of emotional aspects of consumer behavior.

Consumer behavior investigates both an individual's conscious choices and underlying brain activity levels. For example, neural processes observed provide a more accurate prediction of population-level data in comparison to self-reported data. Neuromarketing can measure the impacts of branding and market strategies before applying them to target consumers. Marketers can then advertise the product so that it communicates and meets the needs of potential consumers with different predictions of choice.

Neuromarketing is also used with big data in understanding modern-day advertising channels such as social networking, search behavior, and website engagement patterns.

== Neuroscience tools ==
There are various neuroscience tools that are used to study consumer decision-making and behaviour. Usually, they include devices that can measure vital physiological functions (e.g., heartbeat, respiration rate, blood pressure) and reflexes (e.g., gaze fixation, pupil dilation, face expression). These tools reveal information about impressions, reactions (e.g., positive, negative) and emotional responses (e.g., positive, negative) when exposed to marketing stimuli Consumer neuroscience tools also allow real-time measurements of brain activity, such as functional magnetic resonance imaging (fMRI) and electroencephalogram (EEG). Tools can be divided in three categories based on the type of measurements: (1) Self reports and behavioural, (2) Physiological and (3) Neurophysiological. The tools currently used in consumer neuroscience research are EEG, fMRI, fNIRS, ECG, ET, GSR, and fERS. EEG is the most commonly used tool in consumer neuroscience research.

== Segmentation and positioning ==
Based on the proposed neuromarketing concept of decision processing, consumer buying decisions rely on either System 1 or System 2 processing or Plato's two horses and a chariot. System 1 thinking is intuitive, unconscious, effortless, fast and emotional. In contrast, decisions driven by System 2 are deliberate, conscious reasoning, slow and effortful. Zurawicki says that buying decisions are driven by one's mood and emotions; concluding that compulsive and or spontaneous purchases were driven by System 1.

Young people represent a high share of buyers in many industries including the electronics market and fashion industry. Due to the development of brain maturation, adolescents are subject to strong emotional reaction, although can have difficulty identifying the emotional expression of others. Marketers can use this neural information to target adolescents with shorter, attention-grabbing messages (using various media, like sound or moving images), and ones that can influence their emotional expressions clearly. Teenagers rely on more "gut feeling" and don't fully think through consequences, so are mainly consumers of products based on excitement and impulse. Due to this behavioral quality, segmenting the market to target adolescents can be beneficial to marketers that advertise with an emotional, quick-response approach.

Marketers use segmentation and positioning to divide the market into smaller target markets, or segmentations, to strategically position their brand, product, or service with relevant attributes. Neuromarketing methodology takes into consideration multiple facets of each segmentation, such as their behavioral, demographic, and psychographic interests to create a one-to-one dialog and connection to the brand. This creates sociographic cohorts for the brand to directly message.

For example, neurological differences between genders can influence target markets and segmentations. Research has shown that structural differences between the male and female brain have a strong influence on their respective decisions as consumers.

== Criticism ==
=== Pseudoscience ===
Many of the claims of companies that sell neuromarketing services are not based on actual neuroscience and have been debunked as hype, and have been described as part of a fad of pseudoscientific "neuroscientism" in popular culture. Joseph Turow, a communications professor at the University of Pennsylvania, dismisses neuromarketing as another reincarnation of gimmicky attempts for advertisers to find non-traditional approaches toward gathering consumer opinion. He is quoted as saying, "There has always been a holy grail in advertising to try to reach people in a hypodermic way. Major corporations and research firms are jumping on the neuromarketing bandwagon, because they are desperate for any novel technique to help them break through all the marketing clutter. It's as much about the nature of the industry and the anxiety roiling through the system as it is about anything else."

=== Privacy invasion ===
Some consumer advocate organizations, such as the Center for Digital Democracy, have criticized neuromarketing's potentially invasive technology. Neuromarketing is a controversial field that uses medical technologies to build marketing campaigns according to Gary Ruskin, an executive director of Commercial Alert. The issue in privacy comes from consumers being unaware of the purpose of the research, how the results will be used, or have not even given consent in the first place. Some are even afraid that neuromarketers will have the ability to read a consumer's mind and put them at "risk of discrimination, stigmatization, and coercion."

However, industry associations across the world have taken measures to address the issue around privacy. For example, The Neuromarketing Science & Business Association has established general principles and ethical guidelines surrounding best practices for researchers to adhere to such as:

1. Do not bring any kind of prejudice in research methodology, results and participants
2. Do not take advantage of participants lack of awareness in the field
3. Communicate what participants should expect during research (methodologies)
4. Be honest with results
5. Participant data should remain confidential
6. Reveal data collection techniques to participants
7. Do not coerce participants to join a research and allow them to leave when they want

The above is not a full list of what researchers should abide by, but it mitigates the risk of researchers breaching a participant's privacy if they want their research to be academically recognized.

=== Manipulation ===
Jeff Chester, the executive director of the Center for Digital Democracy, claims that neuromarketing is "having an effect on individuals that individuals are not informed about." Further, he claims that though there has not historically been regulation on adult advertising due to adults having defense mechanisms to discern what is true and untrue, regulations should now be placed: "if the advertising is now purposely designed to bypass those rational defenses ... protecting advertising speech in the marketplace has to be questioned." Consumers' expectations and familiarity with repetitive behaviors will make the brain relax its vigilance, and subconsciously will run in products faster and more conveniently to speed up on finishing the process of shopping. This behavior will more easily bypass consumers' rationality. Similarly, subconscious marketing techniques will produce high emotions for fun-oriented luxury shopping, including excitement and self-confidence, self-aggressive awareness of consumption prevention, and naturally amplify the benefits of consumption.

Advocates nonetheless argue that society benefits from neuromarketing innovations. German neurobiologist Kai-Markus Mueller promotes a neuromarketing variant, "neuropricing", that uses data from brain scans to help companies identify the highest prices consumers will pay. Müller says "everyone wins with this method", because brain-tested prices enable firms to increase profits, thus increasing prospects for survival during economic recession.

== Limitations ==
Neuromarketing is not a replacement for traditional marketing methods but, rather, a field to be used alongside traditional methods to gain a clearer picture of a consumer's profile. Neuromarketing provides insights into the implicit decisions of a consumer, but it is still important to know the explicit decisions and attractions of consumers.

To carry out a complete marketing research, the usage of both neuromarketing and traditional marketing experiments is necessary. As researchers know that customers say what they think they should say, not what they feel, an accurate study will happen in two steps: 1. understand what drives customers' attention, emotions, and memories towards the brand or the product, using neuromarketing methodologies. 2. conduct conventional marketing researches such as focus groups to establish the marketing mix.

Neuromarketing is also limited by the high costs of conducting research. Research requires a variety of technologies such as fMRI, EEG, biometrics, facial coding, and eye-tracking to learn how consumers respond and feel to stimuli. However, the cost to rent or own these technologies may be large, and a lab may be needed to operate the aforementioned technologies.

== In popular culture ==
An Off-Broadway play by Edward Einhorn, The Neurology of the Soul, was set at a fictional neuromarketing firm.

== See also ==
- Neuromanagement
- Consumer neuroscience
- Behavioral economics
- Neurocinema
- Neuroeconomics
- Neuroethics
- Subliminal stimuli
- Neurobranding
