= Consumer neuroscience =

Combination of consumer research with modern neuroscience

Consumer neuroscience is the combination of consumer research with modern neuroscience. The goal of the field is to find neural explanations for consumer behaviors in individuals both with or without disease.

== Consumer research ==
Consumer research has existed for more than a century and has been well established as a combination of sociology, psychology, and anthropology, and popular topics in the field revolve around consumer decision-making, advertising, and branding. For decades, however, consumer researchers had never been able to directly record the internal mental processes that govern consumer behavior; they always were limited to designing experiments in which they alter the external conditions in order to view the ways in which changing variables may affect consumer behavior (examples include changing the packaging or changing a subject’s mood). With the integration of neuroscience with consumer research, it is possible to go directly into the brain to discover the neural explanations for consumer behavior. The ability to record brain activity with electrodes and advances in neural imaging technology make it possible to determine specific regions of the brain that are responsible for critical behaviors involved in consumption.

Consumer neuroscience is similar to neuroeconomics, neurobranding, and neuromarketing, but subtle, yet distinct differences exist between them. Neuroeconomics is more of an academic field while neuromarketing and consumer neuroscience are more of an applied science. Neuromarketing focuses on the study of various marketing techniques and attempts to integrate neuroscience knowledge to help improve the efficiency and effectiveness of said marketing strategies. Consumer neuroscience is unique among the three because the main focus is on the consumer and how various factors affect individual preferences and purchasing behavior.

== Advertising ==
=== Advertising and emotion ===
Studies of emotion are crucial to advertising research as it has been shown that emotion plays a significant role in ad memorization. Classically in advertising research, the theory has been that emotion and ratio are represented in different regions of the brain, but neuroscience may be able to disprove this theory by showing that the ventromedial prefrontal cortex and the striatum play a role in bilateral emotion processing.

The attractiveness of the advertisements correlates with specific changes in brain activity in various brain regions including the medial prefrontal cortex, posterior cingulate, nucleus accumbens and higher-order visual cortices. This may represent an interaction between the perceived attractiveness of the ad by the consumer and the emotions expressed by the people pictured in the advertisement. It has been suggested that ads that use people with positive emotions are perceived as attractive while ads using exclusively text or depicting people with neutral expressions may generally be viewed as unattractive. Unattractive ads activate the anterior insula, which plays a role in the processing of negative emotions. Both attractive and unattractive ads have been shown to be more memorable than ads described as ambiguously attractive, but more research is needed to determine how this translates to the overall brand perception in the eyes of the consumer and how this may impact future purchasing behavior.

=== Mental processing of advertisements ===
There are various studies that have been conducted to research the question of how consumers process and store the information presented in advertisements. Television commercials with scene durations lasting longer than 1.5 seconds have been shown to be more memorable one week later than scenes that last less than 1.5 seconds, and scenes that produce the quickest electrical response in the left frontal hemisphere have been shown to be more memorable as well. It has been suggested that the transfer of visual advertising inputs from short term memory to long term memory may take place in the left hemisphere, and highly memorable ads can be created by producing the fastest responses in the left hemisphere. However, these theories have been renounced by some who believe that the research findings may be attributed to extraneous and unmeasured factors. There is also evidence to suggest that a front to back difference in processing speed may be more influential on ad memorization than left to right differences.

Research has shown that there are certain periods of commercials that are far more significant for the consumer in terms of establishing advertising effects. These short segments are referred to as “branding moments” and are thought to be the most engaging parts of the commercial. These moments can be identified using an EEG and analyzing alpha waves (8–13 Hz), beta waves (13–30 Hz) and theta waves (4–7 Hz). These results may suggest that the strength of a commercial with regard to its effect on the consumer can be evaluated by the strength of its unique branding moments, helping brands create more engaging and effective AR campaigns.

In addition, research has also found that a consequence of curiosity, in terms of advertising, is that an unsatisfied curiosity can lead to indulgent consumption in any domain.

=== Affective vs. cognitive ads ===
Affective advertising (using comedy, drama, suspense, etc.) activates the amygdala, the orbitofrontal cortices, and the brainstem whereas cognitive advertising (strict facts) mainly activates the posterior parietal cortex and the superior prefrontal cortices. Ambler and Burne in 1999 created the Memory-Affect-Cognition (MAC) theory to explain the processes involved in decision making. According to the theory, the majority of decisions are habitual and do not require affect or cognition; they require memory only. Most of the remaining decisions only require memory and affect; they do not require cognition. The main use for cognition is in the form of rationalization following a particular action, however, there are occasional instances in which memory, affect and cognition are all used in conjunction, such as during a debate about a particular choice. The above findings suggest a correlation exists between ad memorization and the degree of affective content within the advertisement, but it is still unclear how this translates to brand memory.

== Branding ==
=== Brand associations ===
Much of consumer research is devoted to studying the effect of brand associations on consumer preferences and how they manifest into brand memories. Brand memories can be defined as “everything that exists in the minds of customers with respect to a brand (e.g. thoughts, feelings, experiences, images, perceptions, beliefs and attitudes)”. Several studies have indicated there is not a designated area of the brain devoted to brand recognition. Studies have shown that different areas of the brain are activated when exposed to a brand as opposed to a person, and decisions regarding the evaluation of brands in different product categories activate the area of the brain responsible for semantic object processing rather than areas involved with the judgment of people. These two findings suggest that brands are not processed by the brain in the same manner as human personalities, indicating that personality theory cannot be used to explain brand preferences.

=== Consumer neuroscience explains brand loyalty ===
In a study of fMRI scans of loyal and less loyal customers it was found that in the case of loyal customers the presence of a particular brand serves as a reward during choice tasks, but less loyal customers do not exhibit the same reward pathway. It was also found that loyal customers had greater activation in the brain areas concerned with emotion and memory retrieval suggesting that loyal customers develop an affective bond with a particular brand, which serves as the primary motivation for repeat purchases.

Brand loyalty has been shown to be the result of changes in neural activity in the striatum, which is part of the human action reward system. In order to become brand loyal the brain must make a decision of brand A over brand B, a process which relies on the brain to make predictions based upon expected reward and then evaluate the results to learn loyalty. The brain is required to remember both positive and negative outcomes of previous brand choices in order to accurately be able to make predictions regarding the expected outcome of future brand decisions. For example, a helpful salesman or a discount in price may serve as a reward to encourage future customer loyalty. It is thought that the amygdala and striatum are the two most prominent structures for predicting the outcomes of decisions, and that the brain learns to better predict in part by establishing a larger neural network in these structures.

For recently formed brand relationships, there is greater self-reported emotional arousal. Over time, that self-reported emotional arousal decreases and inclusion increases. When tested through skin conductance, increased emotional arousal for recently formed close relationships was found, but not for already established close brand relationships. Also, an association was found between insula activation (a brain area connected to urging, addiction, loss aversion, and interpersonal love), and established close relationships.

Research shows that brand betrayal is neuro-physiologically different from brand dissatisfaction. Brand betrayal is associated with feelings of psychological loss, self-castigation over previous brand support, anger from indignation, and rumination. Thus, compared with brand dissatisfaction, brand betrayal is likely to be more harmful to both the brand and the person’s relationship with the brand. This makes brand betrayal more difficult for marketers to deflect, with longer-lasting consequences.

In an attempt to model how the brain learns, a temporal difference learning algorithm has been developed which takes into account expected reward, stimuli presence, reward evaluation, temporal error, and individual differences. As yet this is a theoretical equation, but it may be solved in the near future.

=== How branding affects consumers ===
Brands serve to connect consumers to the products they are purchasing either by establishing an emotional connection or by creating a particular image. It has been shown that when consumers are forced to choose an item from a group in which a familiar brand is present the choice is much easier than when consumers are forced to choose from a group of entirely unfamiliar brands. One MRI study found that there was significantly increased activation in the brain reward centers including the orbitofrontal cortex, the ventral striatum and the anterior cingulate when consumers were looking at sports cars as compared to sedans (presumably because the status symbol associated with sports cars is rewarding in some way). Many corporations have conducted similar MRI studies to investigate the effect of their brand on consumers including Delta Air Lines, General Motors, Home Depot, Hallmark, and Motorola but the results have not been made public.

A study by McClure et al. investigated the difference in branding between Coca-Cola and Pepsi. The study found that when the two drinks were tasted blind there was no difference in consumer preference between the brands. Both drinks produced equal activation in the ventromedial prefrontal cortex, which is thought to be activated because the taste is rewarding. When the subjects were informed of the brand names the consumers preferred Coke, and only Coke activated the ventromedial prefrontal cortex, suggesting that drinking the Coke brand is rewarding beyond simply the taste itself. More subjects preferred Coke when they knew it was Coke than when the taste testing was anonymous, which demonstrates the power of branding to influence consumer behavior. There was also significant activation in the hippocampus and dorsolateral prefrontal cortex when subjects knew they were drinking Coke. These brain structures are known to play a role in memory and recollection, which indicates they are helping the subjects to connect their present drinking experience to previous brand associations. The study proposes that there are two separate processes contributing to consumer decision making: the ventromedial prefrontal cortex responds to sensory inputs and the hippocampus and dorsolateral prefrontal cortex recall previous associations to cultural information. According to the results of this study, the Coke brand has much more firmly established itself as a rewarding experience.

== Packaging ==
Consumer neuroscience research has also invested in how firms package their goods, how designers apply principles of aesthetics to package design, and how consumers neurophysiologically respond to packaged goods. One such finding is that the reaction time of a consumer's choice is significantly increased when the product has aesthetic packaging. Similarly, aesthetic packaging also leads to a product being chosen over a product in standard packaging, even if the standard-packaged product is from a well-known brand and is less expensive.

When packaging is deemed aesthetic, there is an increase in activation in the nucleus accumbens and the ventromedial prefrontal cortex.

== Purchasing ==
Research in consumer buying has focused on the identification of processes that contribute to an individual making a purchase. The brain does not contain a “buy button”, but rather recruits several processes during choice tasks, and studies report that the prefrontal cortex is heavily involved in limiting the emotions expressed during impulse buying. Reducing the effect of these executive control areas of the brain may contribute to changes in purchasing behavior, for example music may lead to reduced cognitive control which is why it has been shown to correlate with a higher percentage of unplanned purchases.

=== Purchasing process ===
Several MEG studies have been conducted to measure the neuronal correlates associated with decision making in order to investigate the underlying processes governing purchasing. The studies suggest that decisions involved with purchasing can be seen as occurring in two halves. The first half is concerned with memory recall and problem identification and recognition. The second half is associated with the purchasing decision itself; familiar brands produce different brain patterns than do nonfamiliar brands. The right parietal cortex is activated when consumers choose a familiar brand, which indicates the choice is at least partially intentional and behavior is influenced by prior experiences.

=== Familiar vs. unfamiliar purchases ===
When consumers select less well known products or products that are completely unfamiliar, several areas of the brain are activated to help with the decision making process that are not activated when consumers select more well known products. There is an increased synchronization between the right dorsolateral cortices (associated with consideration of multiple sources of information), there is increased activity in the right orbitofrontal cortex (associated with evaluation of rewards) and there is increased activity in the left inferior frontal cortex (associated with silent vocalization). Activation in these brain structures indicates that the decision between less well known products is difficult in some way. MEG findings also suggest that even repetitive daily shopping that is apparently simple actually relies on very complex neural mechanisms.

== Associated areas of the brain ==
=== Ventromedial prefrontal cortex ===
It has been shown that the ventromedial prefrontal cortex is heavily involved in decisions regarding brand-related preferences and individuals with damage to this region of the brain do not demonstrate normal brand-preference behavior. People with damage to the ventromedial prefrontal cortex have also been found to be more easily influenced by misleading advertisement.

=== Amygdala and striatum ===
It is thought that the amygdala and striatum are the two most prominent structures for predicting the outcomes of decisions, and that the brain learns to better make predictions in part by establishing a larger neural network in these structures.

=== Hippocampus and dorsolateral prefrontal cortex ===
The hippocampus and dorsolateral prefrontal cortex help consumers recall previous associations with cultural information and cultural expectations. These associations with prior information serve to modify consumer behavior and influence purchasing decisions.

== Real-world applications ==
Consumer research provides a real-world application for neuroscience studies. Consumer studies help neuroscience to learn more about how healthy and unhealthy brain functions differ, which may assist in discovering the neural source of consumption-related dysfunctions and treat a variety of addictions. Additionally, studies are currently underway to investigate the neural mechanism of “anchoring”, which has been thought to contribute to obesity because people are more influenced by the behaviors of their peers than an internal standard. Discovering a neural source of anchoring may be the key to preventing behaviors that typically lead to obesity.

== Limitations ==
1. Most of the consumer neuroscience studies involving brain scanning techniques have been conducted in medical or technological environments where such brain imaging devices are present. This is not a realistic environment for consumer decision making and may serve to skew the data relative to consumer decision making in normal consumer environments.
2. Testing underlying neurophysiological principles is extraordinarily difficult from an experimental setup standpoint simply because it is unclear exactly how various factors are perceived in the human mind. An extremely comprehensive understanding of the neuroscientific testing techniques to be used is required to be able to establish proper controls and create an environment such that test subjects are not inadvertently exposed to unwanted stimuli that may bias results.
3. There are many concerns over the value and the potential usage of consumer neuroscience data. The potential for enhanced consumer welfare is certainly present but equally present is the potential for the information to be used inappropriately for individual gain. The reaction to emerging study results in both the public and the media remains to be seen.
4. In its current state, consumer neuroscience research is a compilation of only loosely related subjects that is unable, at this point, to produce any collective conclusions.

== See also ==
- Neuromarketing
- Neuromanagement
