= Neurobranding =

Neurobranding, an offshoot of Neuromarketing

Neurobranding is a field of study that applies findings from neuroscience and psychology to brand development, management, and customer engagement. It seeks to understand how consumers' brains respond to brand elements, including logos, advertisements, packaging, and storytelling, through methods like neuroimaging, biometric measurements, and psychological analysis.

Neurobranding is distinct from neuromarketing in that it specifically focuses on the long-term cognitive and emotional connections between consumers and brands, rather than just optimizing short-term advertising effectiveness.

== Background ==
Neurobranding developed as an offshoot of neuromarketing research in the early 2000s, building on studies that explored how emotional responses and memory formation influence brand perception. Unlike traditional branding, which often relies on intuition and qualitative feedback, neurobranding is grounded in empirical data from neuroscience, psychology, and behavioral economics. It aims to identify the specific neural pathways and cognitive triggers that drive brand loyalty and customer preference.

== Research methods ==
Neurobranding research employs a range of scientific tools and methods to measure the brain's responses to brand stimuli:

Functional Magnetic Resonance Imaging (fMRI) – measures brain activity by detecting changes in blood flow, providing insights into emotional and cognitive processing during brand exposure.

Electroencephalography (EEG) – records electrical activity in the brain, capturing immediate neural reactions to brand imagery and messaging.

Biometric Sensors – track physiological responses like heart rate, skin conductance, and pupil dilation to gauge emotional arousal and engagement.

Eye Tracking – monitors visual attention and focus to assess how consumers interact with brand elements in real time.

Rapid Implicit Association Testing (RIAT) – measures subconscious brand associations by analyzing reaction times to specific prompts and stimuli.

== Notable research ==
Several foundational studies have shaped the field of Neurobranding:

McClure et al. (2004) conducted one of the first fMRI studies demonstrating that brand knowledge can alter sensory perception. Participants in the study showed significantly different brain responses when tasting branded versus unbranded cola, highlighting the role of memory and brand associations in shaping consumer preferences.

Hasson et al. (2004) demonstrated that compelling narratives can synchronize brain activity between speakers and listeners, suggesting a neurological basis for brand storytelling.

Paul J. Zak's research at Claremont Graduate University has explored the role of oxytocin in trust formation, revealing that emotional engagement can significantly impact brand loyalty and customer retention.

Antonio Damasio's (2005) work on the somatic marker hypothesis has influenced how brands approach emotional branding, emphasizing the critical role of emotional processing in decision-making.

== Applications and limitations ==
Neurobranding has been applied in industries ranging from consumer electronics to luxury goods, where deep emotional connections are crucial for long-term brand success. However, practical applications face several limitations:

- Small sample sizes in neuroimaging studies, which can limit generalizability
- Artificial laboratory environments that may not reflect real-world consumer behavior
- High costs associated with advanced neuroimaging equipment
- Ethical concerns related to privacy and the manipulation of subconscious behavior

== Criticism ==
Neurobranding, like its parent field neuromarketing, has faced skepticism from academics and industry professionals:

Butler (2008) argued that many commercial applications lack scientific rigor and overpromise their effectiveness.

Ariely and Berns (2010) cautioned against oversimplifying complex neural processes in business contexts.

Knutson and Karmarkar (2017) noted the gap between controlled laboratory findings and real-world purchasing behavior.

Satel and Lilienfeld (2013) warned against "neuromania" – the overinterpretation of brain scan results for marketing purposes.

== Ethical concerns ==
Ethical debates around neurobranding often focus on privacy, consent, and the potential for manipulation. Critics argue that using neuroscience to influence consumer behavior raises moral questions, particularly when targeting vulnerable populations or exploiting subconscious decision-making processes.

== See also ==
- Neuromarketing
- Consumer Behavior
- Brand Management
- Neuroeconomics
