= Standard operating procedure =

Set of detailed instructions to assist in workplace safety

A standard operating procedure (SOP) is a standardized way of doing a task or the set of step-by-step instructions that document how it is done. SOPs are compiled by an organization to help workers carry out routine operations. SOPs aim to achieve efficiency, quality output, and uniformity of performance, while reducing miscommunication and failure to comply with industry regulations.

Some military services (e.g., in the US and the UK) use the term standing operating procedure, since a military SOP is often a unit's unique procedure, not one that is standard across units. The word standard could suggest that only one (standard) procedure is to be used across all units.

The term is sometimes used facetiously to refer to practices that are unconstructive, yet the norm. In the Philippines, for instance, SOP is the term for pervasive corruption within the government and its institutions.

A single process may be described by one or more SOPs, depending on how many alternatives may apply.

== Clinical research and practice ==
In clinical research, the International Council for Harmonisation (ICH) defines SOPs as "detailed, written instructions to achieve uniformity of the performance of a specific function". SOPs usually get applied in pharmaceutical processing and for related clinical studies. There the focus is always set on repeated application of unchanged processes and procedures and its documentation, hence supporting the segregation of origins, causes and effects. Further application is with triage, when limited resources get used according to an assessment on ranking, urgence and staffing possibilities. Study director is mainly responsible for SOPs. The Quality Assurance Unit are individuals who are responsible for monitoring whether the study report and tests are meeting the SOP.

SOPs can also provide employees with a reference to common business practices, activities or tasks. New employees use an SOP to answer questions without having to interrupt supervisors to ask how an operation is performed. The international quality standard ISO 9001 essentially requires the determination of processes (documented as standard operating procedures) used in any manufacturing process that could affect the quality of the product.

== Health, safety and environment ==
Standard Operating Procedures are extensively employed to assist with working safely. They are sometimes called "safe work methods statements" (SWMS, pronounced as 'swims'). Their development is usually preceded by various methods of analyzing tasks or jobs to be performed in a workplace, including an approach called job safety analysis, in which hazards are identified and their control methods described. Procedures must be suited to the literacy levels of the user, so the readability of procedures is important.

== See also ==
- Best practice – Method or technique that has been generally accepted as superior
- Procedure – Document instructing workers
- Work method statement
- Safe work procedure
- Checklist – Aide-memoire to ensure consistency and completeness in carrying out a task
- Runbook – Record of procedures for IT system staff
- Code of conduct – Set of rules
- Good practice – Good practice guidelines and regulations
- Protocol
- Operations research – Discipline concerning the application of advanced analytical methods
- Quality control – Processes that maintain quality at a constant level
- Rules of engagement – Internal limits, authorizations and directives on use of force in combat
- Bureaucracy – Administrative system governing any large institution
