= Protocol =

Protocol may refer to:

== Sociology and politics ==
- Protocol (politics), a formal agreement between nation states
- Protocol (diplomacy), the etiquette of diplomacy and affairs of state
- Etiquette, a code of personal behavior

== Science and technology ==
- Protocol (science), a predefined written procedural method of conducting experiments
- Medical protocol (disambiguation)

=== Computing ===
- Protocol (object-oriented programming), a common means for unrelated objects to communicate with each other (sometimes also called interfaces)
- Communication protocol, a defined set of rules and regulations that determine how data is transmitted in telecommunications and computer networking
- Cryptographic protocol, a protocol for encrypting data

== Music ==
- Protocol (album), by Simon Phillips
- Protocol (band), a British band
- "Protocol", a song by Gordon Lightfoot from the album Summertime Dream
- "Protocol", a song by the Vamps from their 2020 album Cherry Blossom
- Protocol Recordings, a record label owned by Nicky Romero

== Other uses ==
- Protocol (film), a 1984 comedy film
- Protocol (website), a tech news website
- Minutes, also known as protocols, the written record of a meeting

== See also ==
- Proto (disambiguation)
- The Protocols of the Elders of Zion, a notorious antisemitic hoax that has circulated since the early 20th century
