= Wates Group =

UK based building contractor

Wates Group Ltd
- Type: Private company
- Industry: Construction; Property Services; Residential Development; Facilities Management
- Founded: 1897
- Headquarters: Leatherhead, Surrey, UK
- Key people: Tim Wates (Chairman); Eoghan O’Lionaird, (CEO)
- Revenue: ▲£1,894 million (2022)
- Operating income: ▲£36.2 million (2022)
- Number of employees: 4,021 (2022)
- Website: www.wates.co.uk

Wates Group Ltd is a family-owned construction, property services and development company in the United Kingdom.

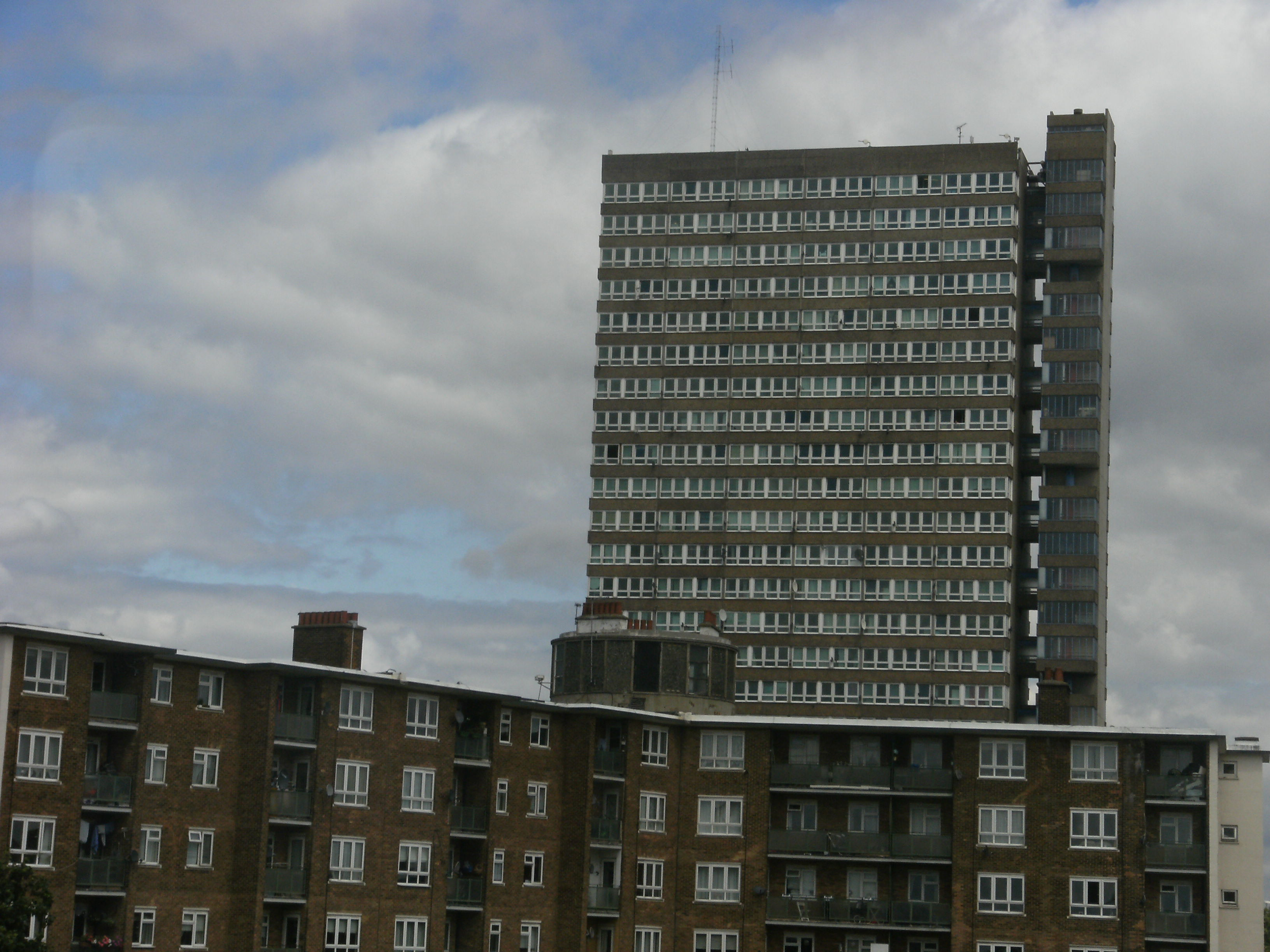
Bradley House and Maydew House on Abbeyfield Estate, Rotherhithe – completed by Wates in 1967

== History ==
Edward Wates established his eponymous business in 1897 as a Streatham housebuilder. In the 1920s and 1930s, it expanded into speculative residential schemes and general contracting; moving to London Road, Mitcham and then Norbury.

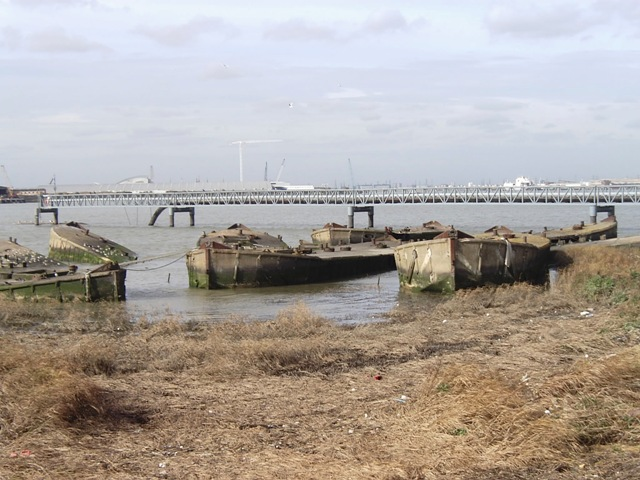
Concrete fuel barges manufactured for military service by Wates

Prior to the outbreak of the Second World War, Wates was building about 2,000 dwellings per annum. It took on substantial military contracts and was active throughout the conflict, applying precast concrete construction on various projects; this included barges, air raid shelters, trench linings, and Mulberry harbours. During the postwar era, the firm applied the same techniques to system built housing (both high and low rise units); it ultimately completed in excess of 60,000 such units.

During the late 1990s, the company was extensively restructured, which included the adoption of a new executive structure and the integration of all London-based divisions. In 2000, Christopher Wates stood back from managing the firm, leading to a non-family member running the business. That same year, Wates Group created an interiors division; it aimed to secure a turnover of £100 million within three years. The following 12 months saw a sharp rise in turnover recorded.

In April 2001, Wates Group teamed up with Carillion on a £240 million housing improvement programme. That same year, the company combined its executive housing, strategic land, and joint ventures and development operations into Wates Residential Developments. Throughout the 2000s, the company would expand its activity in the housing sector; its strategy included the introduction of new prefabrication techniques to accelerate construction and raise residential sales.

During 2002, it expanded its services offerings to include cost planning, facilities management and maintenance activities. In summer 2003, the company reported a one-third reduction in accidents along with record pre-tax profits.

In 2004, Paul Drechsler became CEO of Wates Group; under his direction, the traditional public–private structure of the firm was abandoned and the company's management structure was reorganised. During April 2007, its profits tripled to reach £31 million. Two years later, the company recorded takings in excess of £1 billion for the first time.

For over one hundred years, Wates Group never made any acquisitions; in early 2008, it was announced that the company intended to make its first acquisitions shortly as part of ambitious growth plans over the following five years. Accordingly, Wates purchased property maintenance businesses Linbrook Services Ltd and the Purchase Group Ltd, in June 2011 and November 2014, for £40.8 and £13.6 million respectively. In 2015, Wates acquired the construction, facility management, and engineering services businesses of Shepherd Building Group for £9.8 million. Consequently, 1,200 staff transferred to the firm in September 2015.

In early 2013, Paul Drechsler was replaced as CEO by James Wates. During late 2015, the housing division was split in two, separating the new build and maintenance activities.

During May 2020, 300 redundancies, roughly 8 per cent of the overall workforce, were announced by Wates; the company attributed the move to the economic consequences of the COVID-19 pandemic. Two months later, it announced a reorientation towards housing contracts and the public sector. Over the following years, Wates Group secured work valued in excess of £100 million to retrofit a range of energy efficiency measures to 4,590 social housing properties on behalf of 17 social landlords.

In early 2021, Wates Group announced that it was to adopt flexible working arrangements for all roles by 2025 that would permit different working patterns. During March 2022, the firm announced a leap in pre-tax profits to £37.4 million, the highest ever recorded. That same month, the company secured a £90 million sustainability-linked loan from a syndicate led by Lloyds Bank.

Eoghan O’Lionaird became Chief Executive in February 2023. In early 2024, Wates Group reported strong financial results for 2023, pre-tax profits rose by 37 per cent to £46.2 million in line with a £2.18 billion turnover, which was the largest amount taken by the company. The following year, revenue grew further to £2.4 billion, with profit impacted (in part) by exceptional costs.

== Projects ==
Notable projects include:

- RAF Keevil, 1941
- Housing for Dulwich Estate, 1972
- Doncaster Civic Hall, 2012 (CIOB Project of the Year)
- Victoria and Albert Museum extension, 2017
- Houses of Parliament (repairs and improvements), announced 2025

== Awards ==
- Construction News Contractor of the Year Award 2017.
- Building Major Contractor of the Year Award 2009, 2010 and 2016.

== Philanthropy ==
The Wates Family Enterprise Trust provides funding to help improve social, environmental and human inequality. In 2024, they contributed funds to a public garden and outdoor space in Derby. In March 2025, it was reported that they had provided an £80,000 grant to Be Inspired, a London based group dedicated to tackling youth crime and supporting young people. In July 2025, it was reported that they had donated £10,000 to a foodbank in Finchley.

== Subsidiaries ==
Wates Group Ltd own a number of subsidiaries, including:

Subsidiary name	Area of business
Wates Construction	Construction
Wates Developments	Land, planning and residential development
Wates Property Services	Planned and responsive housing repairs
Wates Residential	Housing developer
SES Engineering Services (SES)	Mechanical and electrical services
Needspace	Affordable workspaces

== Political donations ==
Wates has been a major donor to the UK Conservative Party. Between 2007 and 2017, Wates Group Services Ltd gave £430,000 to the party, including a £50,000 donation in February 2017. In 2024, the Chief Executive of Wates described the company as being politically “agnostic" and said that they had not made donations for years and that they currently did not anticipate making any in the future.

== Controversies ==
=== Carbon monoxide ===
In 2017, Wates Group was fined £640,000 plus £21,000 costs following a breach of the Health and Safety at Work etc. Act 1974. The firm and its subcontractor had inadequately planned replacement of boiler cowls on a 13 storey block of flats. The mistake resulted in a live flue being blocked and carbon monoxide entering dwellings.

=== Glass fatality ===
A banksman was fatally crushed at Wates' 20 Eastbourne Mews site during June 2015 when a glass walling unit fell on him. Westminster Coroner's Court was critical of deficiencies in the lifting plans and method statements in use.

=== Fatal fall ===
In September 2004, Wates Construction entered a guilty plea to a charge of breaching Section 3(1) of the Health and Safety at Work etc. Act 1974 and was fined £150,000 plus £14,769 costs. A subcontractor fell through a skylight at the Royal Artillery Museum, landing 11 metres below, on a concrete floor. The victim died of his injuries four days later. Before the June 2000 incident, Wates had agreed with subcontractors that more protection was required around the skylight but did not suspend construction.

=== Salisbury roof ===
In 1997, Wates built a retail warehouse in Salisbury for Waitrose under a design–build contract. The defective roof collapsed in 2002; claims were made against Wates, and they in turn issued proceedings against their subcontract designer. It emerged Wates had deviated from the original drawings and allegations against inadequate design, were in fact allegations concerned with workmanship. Wates agreed to pay costs to the designer, on a standard basis, not the potentially more expensive indemnity basis. Judge Coulson found Wates should have realised their action against the designer had no merit and abandoned it sooner. Wates was ordered to pay costs on an indemnity basis for that latter part of the case.
