= Safe work procedure =

Risk management tool used by Australian companies

The term safe work procedure (SWP) originated in Victoria, Australia, and is predominantly used as a risk management tool by industries throughout Australia, particularly in the mining sector. SWPs are also referred to using other terms, such as standard operating procedure (SOP). A safe work procedure is a step by step description of a process when deviation may cause a loss. This risk control document created by teams within the company describes the safest and most efficient way to perform a task. This document stays in the health & safety system for regular use as a template or guide when completing that particular task on site.

== Requirements of safe work ==
The document generally lists the associated hazards involved in performing a task, what risk score is associated with the hazards (using a risk matrix), what personal protective equipment is required, and the steps involved to complete the activity without incident.

The document is split up to meet the above requirements as follows;

- Hazards
- Inherent risk
- Control measures
- Residual risk

Each person involved in that task on site must ensure all sections of the SWP are followed.

Safe work procedures are also required for machinery and equipment that is used to perform commercial activities. The procedures are required to be enforced within the workplace and improved as conditions or equipment changes.

== See also ==
- Work method statement
