= Procedure (business) =

Document instructing workers

A procedure is a document that instructs workers on executing one or more activities of a business process. It describes the sequence of steps, and specifies for each step what needs to be done, often including when the procedure should be executed and by whom.

Organizations typically document procedures in their published policy and procedures guide, or their standard operating procedure (S.O.P.) guide. A procedures manual or procedural manual typically gathers together a number of procedures used within an organisation, or for a specific set of functions. For example all airlines give their pilots a S.O.P which holds all the information regarding flying. While procedures typically detail high level steps, a Work Instruction would provide more detail, for example the tools to use and how precisely to use the tools to carry out the procedure.

== See also ==
- Standard operating procedure
