= Paradigm (experimental) =

Experimental setup in behavioral sciences

Cooperative pulling paradigm

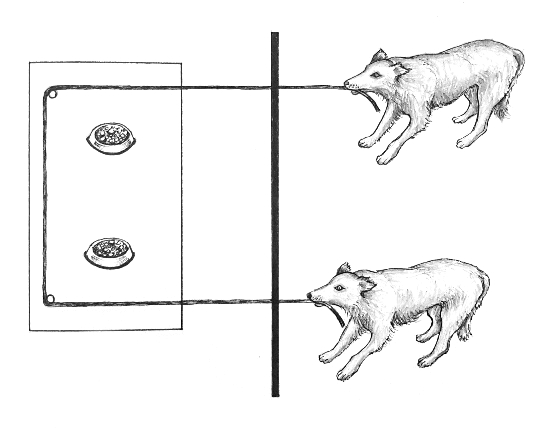
...with dogs

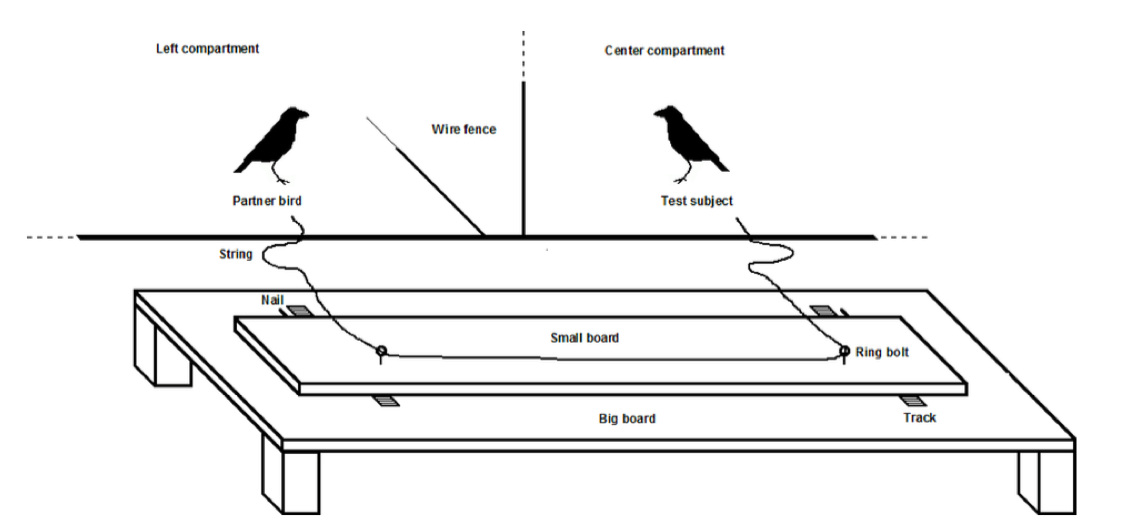
...with birds

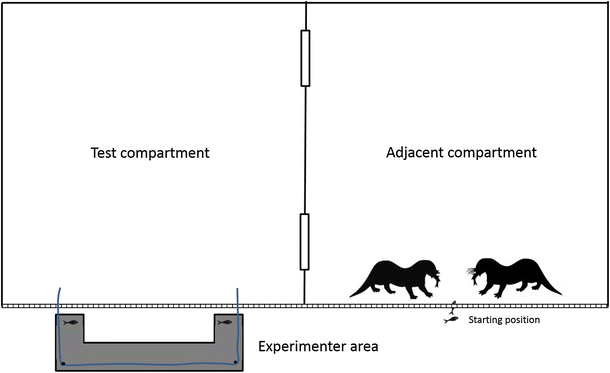
...with otters

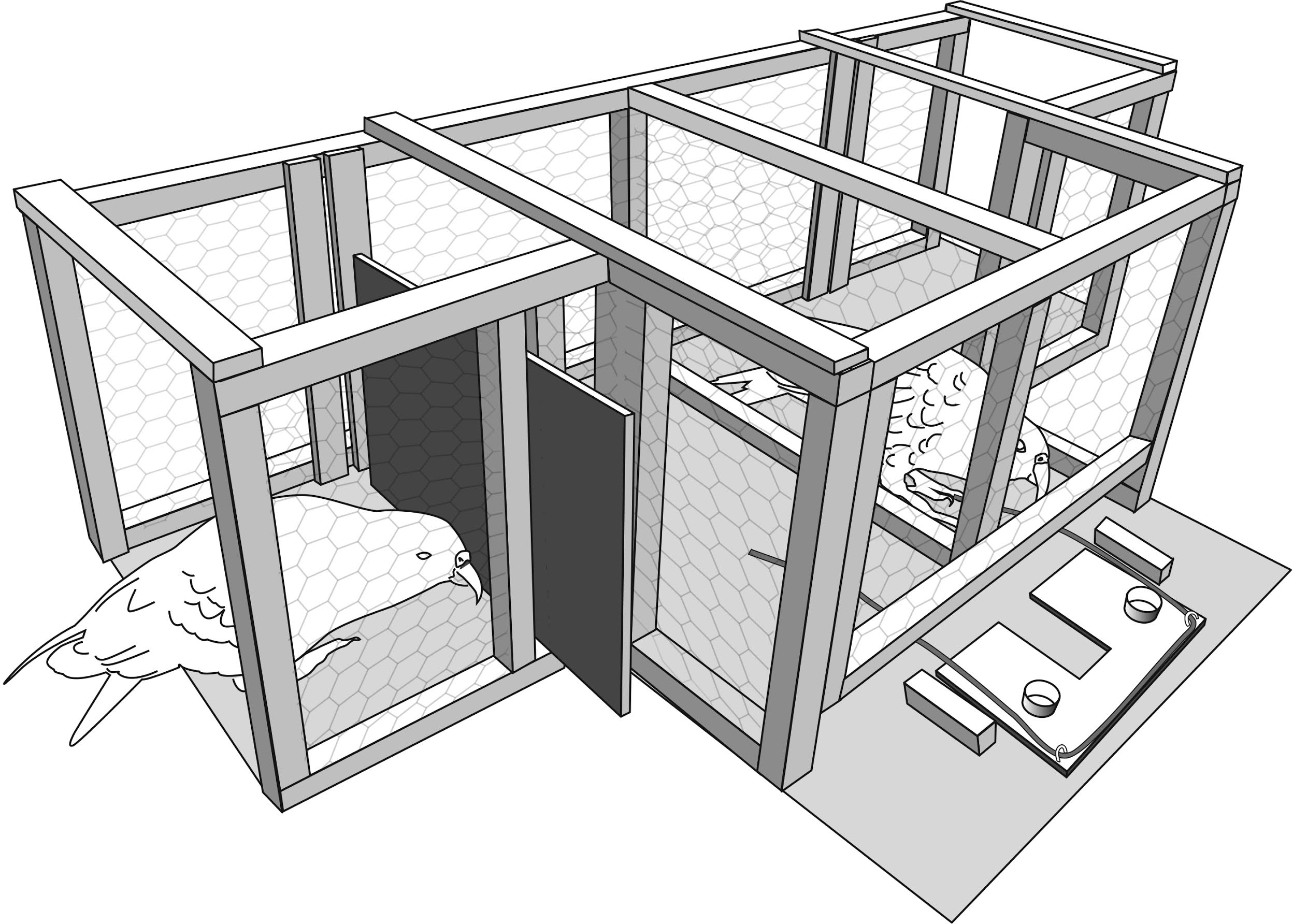
...with keas

Skinner box

In the behavioural sciences (e.g. psychology, biology, neurosciences), an experimental paradigm is an experimental setup or way of conducting a certain type of experiment (a protocol) that is defined by certain fine-tuned standards, and often has a theoretical background. A paradigm in this technical sense, however, is not a way of thinking as it is in the epistemological meaning (paradigm).

In the social sciences empiricist experimentation has independent [and dependent] variables and control conditions...What is the origin of the hypotheses which are studied? Given the basic design, the hypothesis and the particular conditions for the experiment, an experimental paradigm must be made up. The paradigm typically includes factors such as experimental instructions for the subjects, the physical design of the experiment room, and the rules for process of the trial or trials to be carried out.

The more paradigms which are attempted, and the more variables within a single paradigm are attempted, with the same results, the more sure one is of the results, that, "the effect is a true one and not merely a product of artifacts engendered by the use of a particular paradigm." The three core factors of paradigm design may be considered: "(a) ...the 'nuts and bolts' of the paradigm itself...; (b) ...implementation concerns...; and (c) resources available."

An experimental paradigm is a model of research that is copied by many researchers who all tend to use the same variables, start from the same assumptions, and use similar procedures. Those using the same paradigm tend to frame their questions similarly.

For example, the stop-signal paradigm, "is a popular experimental paradigm to study response inhibition." The cooperative pulling paradigm is used to study cooperation. The weather prediction test is a paradigm used to study procedural learning. Other examples include Skinner boxes, rat mazes, and trajectory mapping.

== See also ==
- Glossary of experimental design
- Randomized controlled trial
