= Scientific protocol =

Procedural method for the design and implementation of an experiment

In natural and social science research, a protocol is most commonly a predefined procedural method in the design and implementation of an experiment. Protocols are written whenever it is desirable to standardize a laboratory method to ensure successful replication of results by others in the same laboratory or by other laboratories. Additionally, and by extension, protocols have the advantage of facilitating the assessment of experimental results through peer review. In addition to detailed procedures, equipment, and instruments, protocols will also contain study objectives, reasoning for experimental design, reasoning for chosen sample sizes, safety precautions, and how results were calculated and reported, including statistical analysis and any rules for predefining and documenting excluded data to avoid bias.

Similarly, a protocol may refer to the procedural methods of health organizations, commercial laboratories, manufacturing plants, etc. to ensure their activities (e.g., blood testing at a hospital, testing of certified reference materials at a calibration laboratory, and manufacturing of transmission gears at a facility) are consistent to a specific standard, encouraging safe use and accurate results.

Finally, in the field of social science, a protocol may also refer to a "descriptive record" of observed events or a "sequence of behavior" of one or more organisms, recorded during or immediately after an activity (e.g., how an infant reacts to certain stimuli or how gorillas behave in natural habitat) to better identify "consistent patterns and cause-effect relationships." These protocols may take the form of hand-written journals or electronically documented media, including video and audio capture.

== Experiment and study protocol ==
Various fields of science, such as environmental science and clinical research, require the coordinated, standardized work of many participants. Additionally, any associated laboratory testing and experiment must be done in a way that is both ethically sound and results can be replicated by others using the same methods and equipment. As such, rigorous and vetted testing and experimental protocols are required. In fact, such predefined protocols are an essential component of Good Laboratory Practice (GLP) and Good Clinical Practice (GCP) regulations. Protocols written for use by a specific laboratory may incorporate or reference standard operating procedures (SOP) governing general practices required by the laboratory. A protocol may also reference applicable laws and regulations that are applicable to the procedures described. Formal protocols typically require approval by one or more individuals—including for example a laboratory directory, study director, and/or independent ethics committee—before they are implemented for general use. Clearly defined protocols are also required by research funded by the National Institutes of Health.

In a clinical trial, the protocol is carefully designed to safeguard the health of the participants as well as answer specific research questions. A protocol describes what types of people may participate in the trial; the schedule of tests, procedures, medications, and dosages; and the length of the study. While in a clinical trial, participants following a protocol are seen regularly by research staff to monitor their health and to determine the safety and effectiveness of their treatment. Since 1996, clinical trials conducted are widely expected to conform to and report the information called for in the CONSORT Statement, which provides a framework for designing and reporting protocols. Though tailored to health and medicine, ideas in the CONSORT statement are broadly applicable to other fields where experimental research is used.

Protocols will often address:

- safety: Safety precautions are a valuable addition to a protocol, and can range from requiring goggles to provisions for containment of microbes, environmental hazards, toxic substances, and volatile solvents. Procedural contingencies in the event of an accident may be included in a protocol or in a referenced SOP.
- procedures: Procedural information may include not only safety procedures but also procedures for avoiding contamination, calibration of equipment, equipment testing, documentation, and all other relevant issues. These procedural protocols can be used by skeptics to invalidate any claimed results if flaws are found.
- equipment used: Equipment testing and documentation includes all necessary specifications, calibrations, operating ranges, etc. Environmental factors such as temperature, humidity, barometric pressure, and other factors can often have effects on results. Documenting these factors should be a part of any good procedure.
- reporting: A protocol may specify reporting requirements. Reporting requirements would include all elements of the experiments design and protocols and any environmental factors or mechanical limitations that might affect the validity of the results.
- calculations and statistics: Protocols for methods that produce numerical results generally include detailed formulas for calculation of results. A formula may also be included for preparation of reagents and other solutions required for the work. Methods of statistical analysis may be included to guide interpretation of the data.
- bias: Many protocols include provisions for avoiding bias in the interpretation of results. Approximation error is common to all measurements. These errors can be absolute errors from limitations of the equipment or propagation errors from approximate numbers used in calculations. Sample bias is the most common and sometimes the hardest bias to quantify. Statisticians often go to great lengths to ensure that the sample used is representative. For instance political polls are best when restricted to likely voters and this is one of the reasons why web polls cannot be considered scientific. The sample size is another important concept and can lead to biased data simply due to an unlikely event. A sample size of 10, i.e., polling 10 people, will seldom give valid polling results. Standard deviation and variance are concepts used to quantify the likely relevance of a given sample size. The placebo effect and observer bias often require the blinding of patients and researchers as well as a control group.

Best practice recommends publishing the protocol of the review before initiating it to reduce the risk of unplanned research duplication and to enable transparency, and consistency between methodology and protocol.

=== Blinded protocols ===
A protocol may require blinding to avoid bias. A blind can be imposed on any participant of an experiment, including subjects, researchers, technicians, data analysts, and evaluators. In some cases, while blinding would be useful, it is impossible or unethical. A good clinical protocol ensures that blinding is as effective as possible within ethical and practical constrains.

During the course of an experiment, a participant becomes unblinded if they deduce or otherwise obtain information that has been masked to them. Unblinding that occurs before the conclusion of a study is a source of experimental error, as the bias that was eliminated by blinding is re-introduced. Unblinding is common in blind experiments, and must be measured and reported. Reporting guidelines recommend that all studies assess and report unblinding. In practice, very few studies assess unblinding.

An experimenter may have latitude defining procedures for blinding and controls but may be required to justify those choices if the results are published or submitted to a regulatory agency. When it is known during the experiment which data was negative there are often reasons to rationalize why that data shouldn't be included. Positive data are rarely rationalized the same way.

== See also ==
- Adaptive clinical trial
- Blocking (statistics)
- Design of experiments
- DRAKON
- Estimation
- Estimation theory
- Margin of error
- Medical guideline
- Observational error
- Paradigm (experimental)
- Propagation of error
- Protein methods and Nucleic acid methods
- Random error
- Randomized controlled trial
- Royal Commission on Animal Magnetism
- Sample (statistics)
- Sample size
- Sampling error
- Scientific control
- Standard deviation
- Statistical population
- Survey sampling
- Systematic error
