= Medical protocol =

Medical protocol may refer to:

- Medical guideline, for a medical treatment
  - Medical protocol, a set of rules followed by an emergency medical technician, nurse, physician, therapist, etc.
- Clinical protocol, a method in a clinical trial or medical research study
