= Work method statement =

A work method statement, sometimes referred to as a safe work method statement or SWMS or a safe work procedure, is a part of a workplace safety plan. It is primarily used in construction to describe a document that gives specific instructions on how to safely perform a work related task, or operate a piece of plant or equipment. In many countries it is law to have work method statements, or similar, in place to advise employees and contractors on how to perform work related tasks safely.

The statement is generally used as part of a safety induction and then referred to as required throughout a workplace, they should outline all the hazards that are likely to be encountered when undertaking a task or process and provide detailed guidance on how to carry out the task safely...

== Procedure for use ==
A work method statement is prepared for each task on a particular worksite, the group of work method statements are then packaged and is typically submitted at the beginning of a project for approval by the client or their representative.

== Contents ==
The work method statement encompasses the following:

1. purpose
2. scope
3. references
