= Dierenpark Tilburg =

Coordinates: 51.5604°N 5.0381°E

- Interactive map of Dierenpark Tilburg
- Date opened: 1932
- Date closed: 1973
- Location: Tilburg, Netherlands

The Tilburgs Dierenpark was a zoo at the Bredaseweg in Tilburg, Netherlands.

== History ==
The park opened its doors in 1932 as a wedding present from Johan Burgers (the founder of Royal Burgers' Zoo) to his daughter and her husband from Tilburg. In 1946 the park was sold to C. van Dijk & Sons who helped to develop the park as well. The park was closed in 1973.

== Attractions (incomplete) ==
- Donkeys
- Flamingos
- Giraffes
- Polar bears
- Camels
- Common crane
- Lions
- Elephants
- Parrots
- Penguins
- Rhesus macaque
- Tiger
- Penguins
- Seals

== Show ==
In 2008 a few museums from Tilburg organized an exposition together with writer Nicole van Dijk. As a part of this project a book was published "Het Tilburgs dierenpark, een familiegeschiedenis" (The Tilbury zoo, a family history).
