= Sarah Brosnan =

American psychologist

Sarah Brosnan researches the development of cognitive processes that underlie cooperation and reciprocity. Her work focuses on how animals perceive "exchanged goods and services," as demonstrated by reciprocal interactions. She has examined both human and nonhuman primates behavior as a way of understanding the evolution of cooperative and economic behaviors, specifically the topic of inequity aversion and the cooperative pulling paradigm. She is a Distinguished University Professor at Georgia State University in the Department of Psychology, and directs the university's Comparative Economics and Behavioral Studies Laboratory (CEBUS Lab). Brosnan is involved in research with several other universities, such as the Economic Science Institute and Florida Tech.

Brosnan is codirector of the Language Research Center (2026) and a member of the Brains and Behavior program and the Center for Behavioral Neuroscience at GSU.

== Research ==
Brosnan seeks to understand the evolution of cooperative and economic decision making using primate models to understand how humans make such decisions. Decision making that involves cooperation, inequity and bartering amongst primates can direct better understanding of human inequity and economic decisions.

== Selected publications ==
- Brosnan, Sarah F.; Salwiczek, Lucie; Bshary, Redouan (2 August 2010). "The interplay of cognition and cooperation". Philosophical Transactions of the Royal Society. 365 (1553): 2699–2710. doi:10.1098/rstb.2010.0154. PMC 2936177. PMID 20679113.
- Brosnan, Sarah F. Brosnan; de Waal, Frans B. M. (18 September 2003). "Monkeys reject unequal pay". Nature. 425 (6955): 297–9. Bibcode:2003Natur.425..297B. doi:10.1038/nature01963. PMID 13679918.
- Sarah F., Brosnan; Bshary, Redouan (2 August 2010). "Cooperation and deception: from evolution to mechanisms" (PDF). Philosophical Transactions of the Royal Society. 365 (1553): 2593–2598. doi:10.1098/rstb.2010.0155. PMC 2942876. PMID 20679104. Archived from the original (PDF) on 9 August 2017.
- Brosnan, Sarah F de Waal; de Waal, Frans B. M. (11 March 2004). "Animal behaviour: Fair refusal by capuchin monkeys". Nature. 428 (6979): 140. Bibcode:2004Natur.428..140B. doi:10.1038/428140b.

== See also ==
- Sarah Brosnan Ted Talk https://www.ted.com/speakers/sarah_brosnan
- Inequity aversion
- Inequity aversion in animals
