= Jan van Hooff =

Dutch biologist

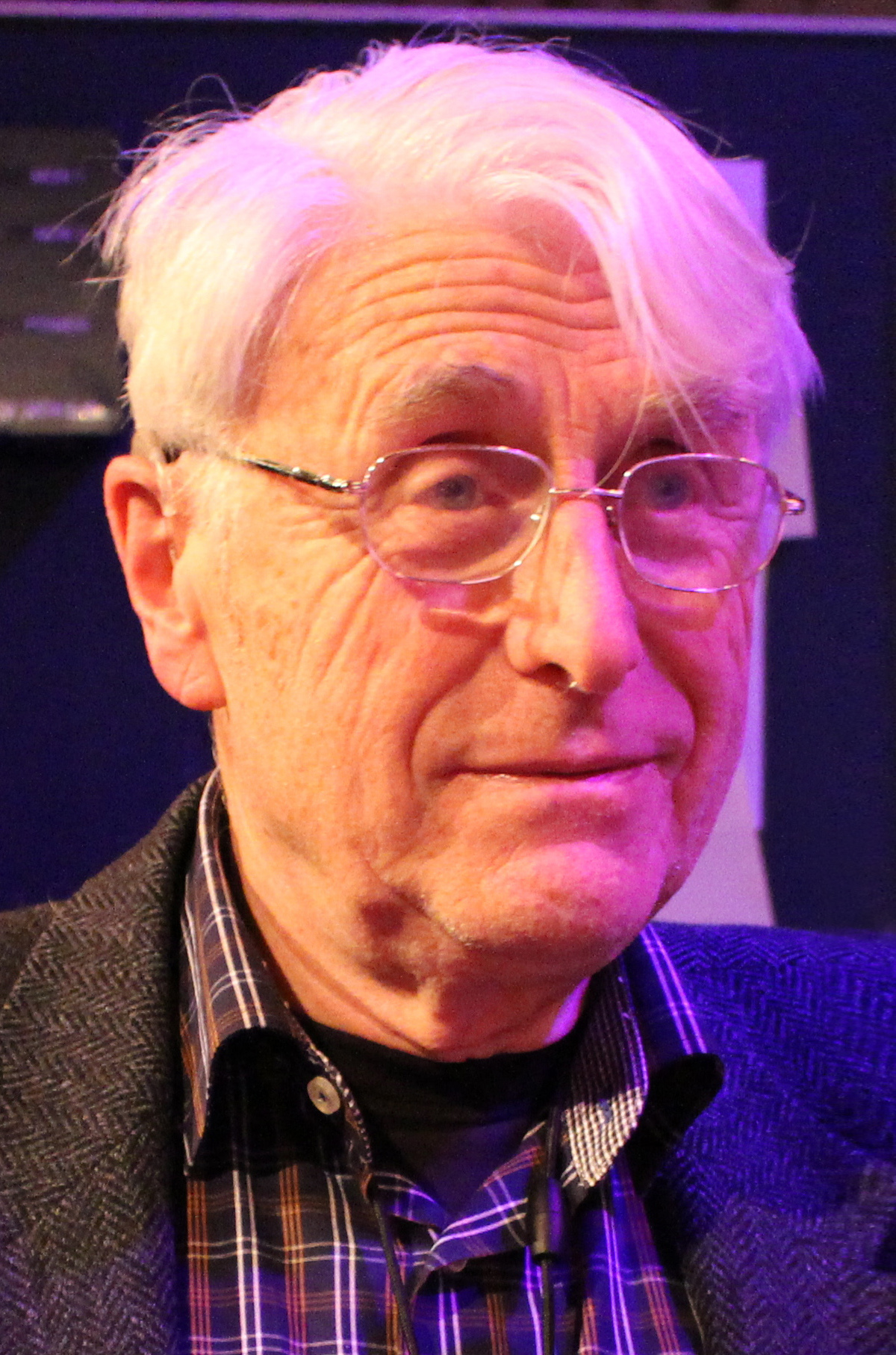
- Van Hooff in 2014
- Born: Johan Antoon Reinier Alex Maria van Hooff; 15 May 1936 (age 90); Arnhem, Netherlands
- Occupations: Biologist, professor comparative physiology

Academic background
- Education: Utrecht University
- Thesis: Aspecten van het sociale gedrag en de communicatie bij humane en hogere niet-humane primaten (1971)
- Doctoral advisor: Nico Frijda, Sven Dijkgraaf

Academic work
- Institutions: Utrecht University
- Doctoral students: Frans de Waal

Johan Antoon Reinier Alex Maria "Jan" van Hooff (born 15 May 1936) is a Dutch biologist best known for his research involving primates. He was professor of comparative physiology at Utrecht University from 1980 to 2001.

== Early life ==
Van Hooff was born in Arnhem on 15 May 1936. He had a younger brother, Antoon van Hooff, and sister, Johanna. During his childhood he grew up at Royal Burgers' Zoo, which had been founded by his grandfather Johan Burgers. The zoo was later taken over by his parents who lodged it through troubling times after the Battle of Arnhem. He grew up with feeding lions, giving bottles to tigers, and a baby macaque abandoned by its mother lived in his home.

Van Hooff started studying biology at Utrecht University in September 1954. During the 1960s the Jan and his brother had a monthly television program titled Zoo Zoo, which was broadcast by the AVRO. After reading the book The Expression of the Emotions in Man and Animals of Charles Darwin he decided he wished to do research on the facial expressions of primates. Not having an opportunity to do so at Utrecht University, he was helped by professor of comparative physiology Sven Dijkgraaf to study at the University of Oxford under Nikolaas Tinbergen and Desmond Morris. While in the United Kingdom he held an experiment during a party at the house of Desmond. He would be courteous, but not smile. After half an hour Van Hooff remained on his own. During the 1960s the parents of Van Hooff needed more help with running the zoo, as Jan was studying in the United Kingdom his brother Antoon helped and later became director.

== Career ==
In 1966 Van Hooff was involved in research concerning socialization of a large group of chimpanzees held at a United States Air Force research institute. Due to Van Hooff's involvement a group of chimpanzees was added to Royal Burgers' Zoo in 1971. This latter group was intensively researched by Frans de Waal, Van Hooff's first PhD student. In 1971 he obtained his doctorate at Utrecht University with a dissertation titled:"Aspecten van het sociale gedrag en de communicatie bij humane en hogere niet-humane primaten" (Aspects of the social behaviour and communication of human and higher non-human primates) under Nico Frijda and Dijkgraaf. In 1973 Van Hooff was named lector of comparative physiology at Utrecht University. In 1980 he became professor. He retired in 2001. During his career he also served as secretary general of the International Primatological Society.

He was elected a member of the Royal Netherlands Academy of Arts and Sciences in 1988. Van Hooff is an Officer in the Order of Orange-Nassau.

A video published in May 2016 showing the emotional reunion of Van Hooff with Mama, a 59-year-old chimpanzee with terminal illness at the Royal Burgers' Zoo, attracted over 10 million views. Mama was the oldest chimpanzee in the Netherlands and had known Van Hooff since 1972. Upon recognising Van Hooff, Mama broke into a wide grin and embraced him. Van Hooff was able to feed and comfort Mama, who had previously refused food. Mama died a week after their reunion.

In 2019 he published his autobiography: Gebiologeerd.
