= Johan Burgers =

Dutch businessman

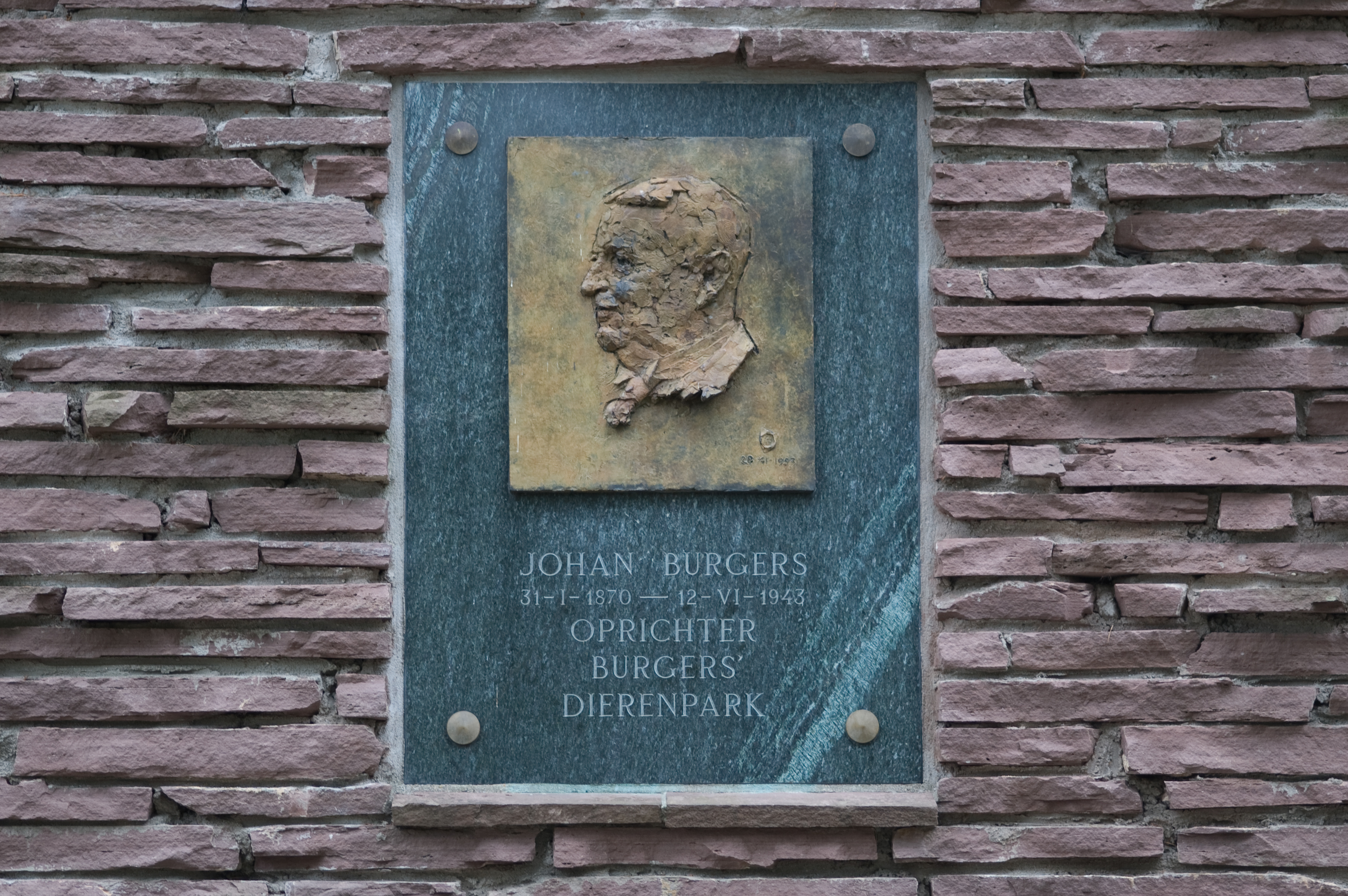
- Born: Johannes Gerhardus Hendrikus Burgers; 31 January 1870 's-Heerenberg
- Died: 12 June 1943 (aged 73); Arnhem
- Occupations: zoo founder and director

Johannes Gerhardus Hendrikus Burgers (31 January 1870 – 12 June 1943) was in 1913 the founder of Burgers' Dierenpark, nowadays called Royal Burgers' Zoo. He was the owner and director of it until 1939. His youngest daughter Lucie Burgers was his successor, with her husband Reinier van Hooff. Their son, Antoon van Hooff (1937-2004), further developed the zoo.

== Biography ==
Johan Burgers was born in 's-Heerenberg. After graduating vocational school, Burgers became an agricultural expert working in Eastern Europe which provided him a decent salary. He returned to his home town to marry, and started a butchery. In 1895, Burgers bought a town house in 's-Heerenberg. In the garden, he kept a collection of pheasants and dogs which earned him many prizes, and lead to the purchase of more animals. To accommodate the growing collection, he bought a piece of land nearby and called it Buitenlust. In 1908, he visited the Tierpark Hagenbeck of Carl Hagenbeck in Hamburg which really impressed him.

In 1913, Burgers opened the site for the public, and added other animals like foxes, wolves and flamingos. Burgers Zoo was the first privately owned public zoo in the Netherlands, because Natura Artis Magistra in Amsterdam was originally only for members. In 1916, Burgers wanted to add lions and bears which was resisted by the local government. In 1918, the city of Arnhem was enthusiastic about his plans, and the zoo was reopened next to the Open Air Museum. In 1932, his daughter Johanna married Johan van Glabbeek, and as a wedding present he gave them Dierenpark Tilburg. In 1939, Burgers retired and appointed his daughter Lucie as his successor.

In the 1940s, Burgers contracted cancer. Burgers died in Arnhem on 12 June 1943.

== Family ==
Burgers was married to Maria Erwig and they had three children together.

Jan van Hooff, biologist and professor of comparative physiology at Utrecht University is one of his grandchildren.
