= Inequity aversion in animals =

Animal behavior

Inequity aversion in animals is the willingness to sacrifice material pay-offs for the sake of greater equality, something humans tend to do from early age. It manifests itself through negative responses when rewards are not distributed equally between animals. In controlled experiments it has been observed, to varying degrees, in capuchin monkeys, chimpanzees, macaques, marmosets, dogs, wolves, rats, crows and ravens. No evidence of the effect was found in tests with orangutans, owl monkeys, squirrel monkeys, tamarins, kea, and cleaner fish. Based on mixed results in experimental studies it may be concluded that some bonobos, baboons, gibbons, and gorillas are inequity averse. Disadvantageous inequity aversion, which occurs when the animal protests as it gets a lesser reward than another animal, is most common. But advantageous inequity aversion has been observed as well, in chimpanzees, baboons and capuchins: the animal protests when it gets a better reward. Scientists believe that sensitivity to inequity co-evolved with the ability to cooperate, as it helps to sustain benefitting from cooperation. There is little evidence for inequity aversion in non-cooperative species.

The first researchers to discover inequity aversion in animals were Sarah Brosnan and Frans de Waal, in an experiment with five capuchins, described in a 2003 article in Nature. The monkeys tended to refuse to participate in a food-for-token exchange task once they saw another monkey get rewarded more desirable food for equal effort. On some occasions they threw the food back at the experimenter.

Dozens of studies have been undertaken since. A few experimental paradigms have been used to test inequity aversion. The exchange is most common. Here animals need to hand over a token to the experimenter in exchange for a food reward. The results and findings are mixed. In terms of refusal rates being higher in inequity conditions than equity, there is substantial variation across species, across studies, and even across individuals within the same studies. Some researchers have argued that small differences in experimental setup can make the effect disappear. This is the case, for instance, if the animals are not side by side and do not have good visibility of their partner and their actions, or if there is no task and the animals are simply given food. In some species the females did not refuse inferior rewards but the males did; in some other species it was the other way around. Due to low sample sizes, not all studies controlled for sex and rank.

== Background ==
The ability of humans to cooperate is well documented, but its origin is an open question. One key aspect of cooperation is a sense of fairness: the reward an individual gets from cooperating should be fair compared to others or else future cooperation may break down. A full-blown concept of fairness is typically present in children aged six, although three-year-olds already prefer a person who distributes rewards from cooperation fairly over one who does so unfairly. When given the choice to accept an unfair reward, most children rejected it if it was less valuable than the reward of their peer (this is called disadvantageous inequity aversion, or sometimes, first-order inequity aversion), researchers Blake and colleagues found in a study across seven countries. Even if it was more valuable than the reward of their peer, older children in three countries still on average rejected it (advantageous inequity aversion or second-order inequity aversion). (Note: Advantageous inequity aversion was found in the US, Canada, and Uganda, but not in Senegal, Peru, Mexico, and India.) Disadvantageous inequity aversion is considered a universal feature of human behavior, whereas advantageous inequity aversion may be strongly influenced by cultural norms.

Humans are not the only cooperative animals. Many species of animals cooperate in the wild. Collaborative hunting has been observed in the air (e.g., among Aplomado falcons), on land (e.g., among chimpanzees), in the water (e.g., among killer whales), and under the ground (e.g., among driver ants). Further examples of cooperation include parents and others working together to raise young (e.g., among African elephants), and groups defending their territory, which has been studied in primates and other social species such as bottlenose dolphins, spotted hyenas, and common ravens. By researching aspects of cooperation in other species, evolutionary psychologists aim to pinpoint when and under which conditions cooperation emerges. With cooperation not being uniquely human, inequity aversion may not be uniquely human either. Fairness in cooperative animals in the wild has also been observed, in particular in primates. Chimpanzees are known to divide the carcass obtained during collective hunting partially based on each individual's contribution to the hunt. Through controlled experiments with animals, researchers look for this behavior and hope to be able to answer the questions of how and why inequity aversion, and cooperative behavior as a whole, evolved.

== First research ==
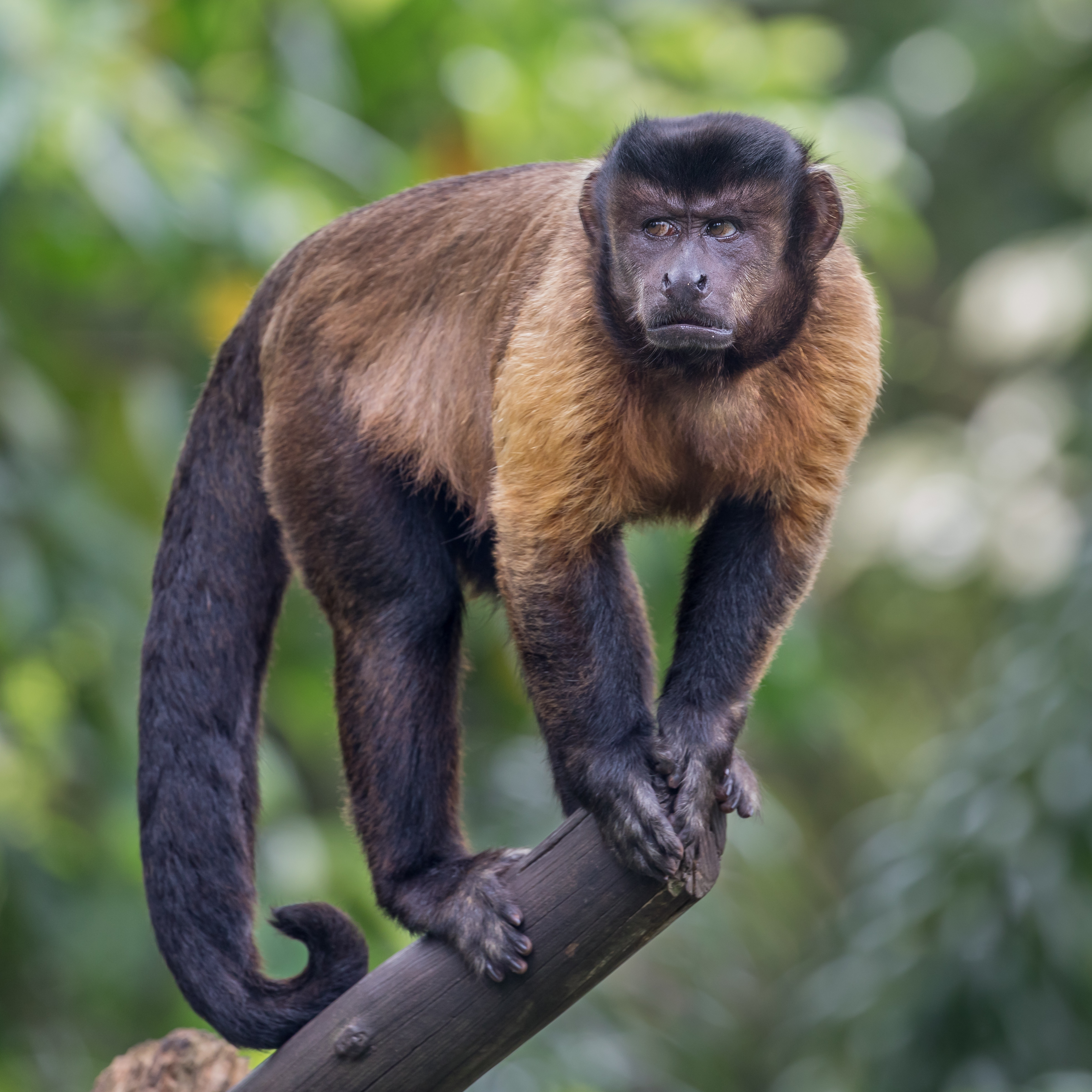
Brown capuchin

The first researcher to test inequity aversion in animals was Sarah Brosnan. As a PhD student at Emory University in Atlanta, Georgia, the idea for an experiment came to her during a feeding session with capuchin monkeys. When she was handing out peanuts to the lower-ranked monkeys, an alpha male named Ozzie offered her an orange, a higher-value food, to also get a peanut. (Note: Brosnan's proposed experiment to better understand this socio-economic behavior nearly was rejected by her PhD committee, because she had already planned six other experiments. But because the committee could not agree on the expected outcome of her proposed experiment, her advisor, professor Frans de Waal, told her she obviously had to do it.) Under guidance of her professor, Frans de Waal, Brosnan set up an experiment to ascertain if a capuchin's behavior is influenced by rewards given to others. In a preliminary test with two conditions, capuchins were tested side by side and were either both given a piece of cucumber as a reward, or one was given cucumber and the other a grape (known to be perceived as a higher-value food). The results indicated that female capuchins might be sensitive to unequal distribution of rewards. Male capuchins did not show any different behavior between the two conditions.

Brosnan subsequently tested five female capuchins in different conditions. As before, the rewards were either equal or inferior to what the other monkey received. Brosnan also tested if it mattered if the other monkey received food as reward for effort or for not doing anything at all. The task the capuchins had to perform was a common exchange task: the experimenter handed the monkey a pebble which simply had to be handed back. If done so, the experimenter would give the food reward. In the side-by-side setting the capuchins could see each other's actions and, crucially, each other's rewards. A further control condition was to ascertain if the behavior was caused merely by the presence of the higher-value reward, since primates have long been known to show a contrast effect. (Note: Research into the contrast effect in animals dates back to 1928 when Tinklepaugh tested the effect of expectation in macaques. He let the monkeys see he put treats under a bucket. The next day he would lift the bucket and hand out the treats. But when he secretly switched the treats for a lettuce leaf, the monkeys reacted poorly in the morning, refusing those rewards.) In this condition there was only one capuchin and the experimenter first placed a grape in front of the empty place where the other monkey would have been, before starting the exchange task with the test subject and a piece of cucumber.

The results showed a clear effect of others' rewards influencing capuchins' acceptance of rewards. Whereas in the equity condition cucumber was happily accepted as reward for handing back the pebble, in the inequity condition cucumber was rejected one in three times. Rejection sometimes took the form of throwing the piece of cucumber back at the experimenter, and sometimes as violently pulling at the dividing screen. One in six times the capuchins did not even return the pebble in the inequity condition. The failure rate to exchange was even higher in the effort control, where the other capuchin got a grape for not doing anything at all: three out of four times there was no successful exchange. In the food control, where grapes were visible but without any other monkey present, the monkeys were also more likely to refuse than in the equity condition.

Each run of tests consisted of 25 trials in the same condition. The researchers compared the results of the first 15 against the last 10. They found that in the inequity condition and in the effort control, the failure rate in the last 10 was higher than in the first 15, suggesting that it may have taken a few trials before the monkeys noticed what reward the other had received. In the food control however, the failure rate in the last 10 was lower than in the first 15, suggesting that expectations are based on seeing a partner receive high-value rewards rather than the mere presence of such rewards. The researchers concluded that female capuchin monkeys are inequity averse.

Brosnan and de Waal published the results of their study in 2003 in the science journal Nature. The study has since been cited over two thousand times in other scientific articles.

== Subsequent studies ==
The original Brosnan and de Waal study has been replicated many times, with various variations of the experimental design and involving a diverse set of species as subjects.

=== Subjects ===
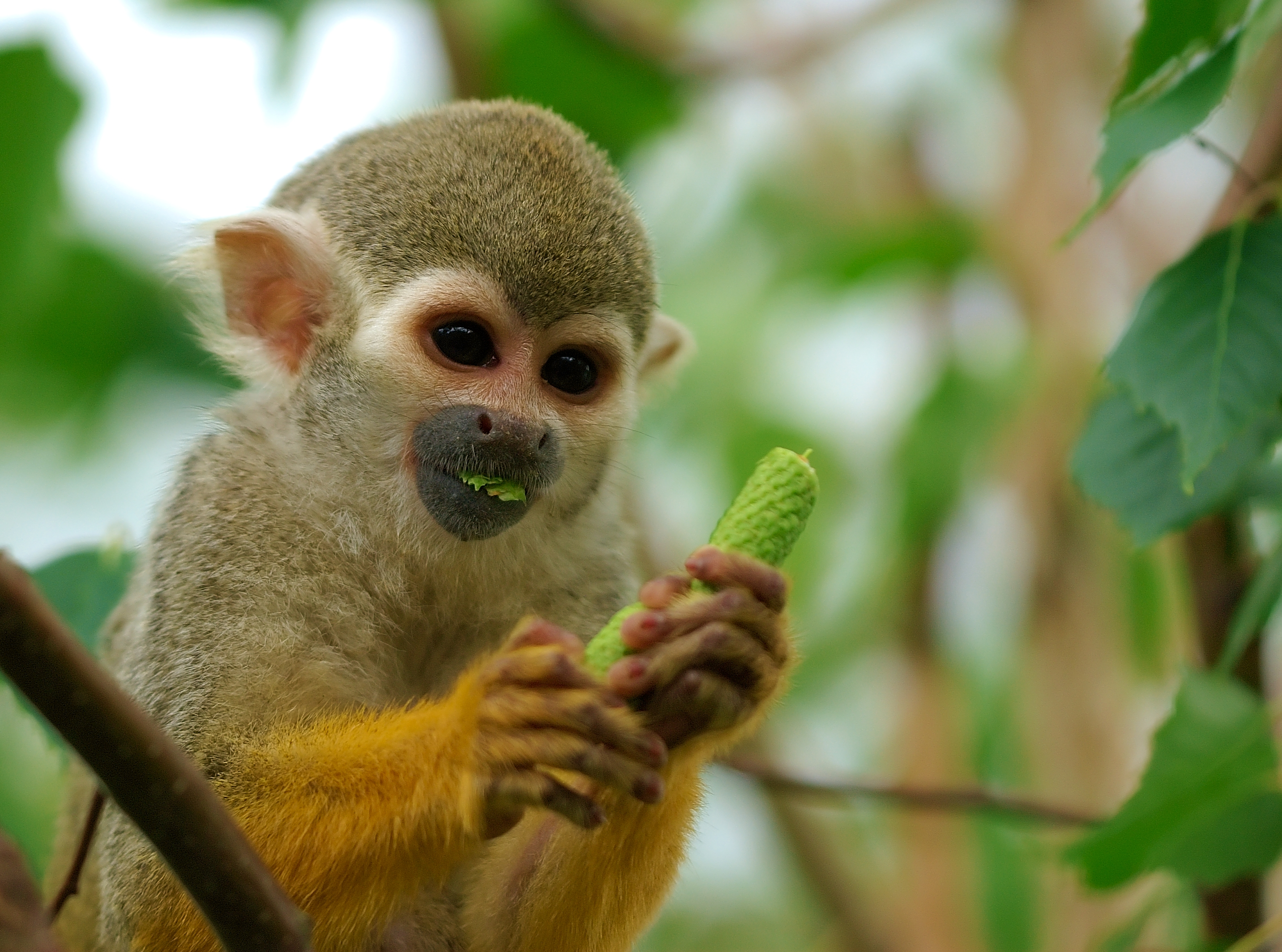
Squirrel monkey

Researchers have selected various species as subjects of their inequity aversion experiments. Within the group of species closely related to humans, researchers have chosen both social primates (chimpanzees, bonobos, owl monkeys, marmosets, baboons, gorillas, and tamarins), and ones living solitary or just with their offspring (orangutans, gibbons, and squirrel monkeys). Researchers have also tested non-primates that display any capability of cooperation: birds (crows, ravens, kea), canines (dogs, wolves), rodents (mice and rats), and cleaner fish. Brosnan and de Waal have called for experiments with elephants, dolphins, and domestic cats to further the understanding of the evolution of fairness.

Within their experiments researchers have controlled for various characteristics of subjects, just like Brosnan and de Waal did by using only female capuchins. A common factor is relationship: whether or not the two animals in the experiment have a genetic relationship or not. Dominance rank in social animals has also been known to play a role in cooperation experiments and is thus often controlled for. The number of subjects frequently is limited, making robust statistical conclusions challenging.

=== Conditions ===
To control for factors that may or may not influence inequity aversion, researchers have used various conditions in their experiments. A food-contrast control is common. Is reward refusal due to the social aspect of the experiment or due to the animal expecting a higher-value reward? Contrast studies date back to the 1920s and involve a series of higher-value rewards, followed by a low-value reward. Subjects can be tested alone or side by side. Some researchers have questioned Brosnan and De Waal's use of the last 10 trials in their food control to arrive at the inequity aversion conclusion. These researchers have designed various ways to control for food expectation, for example hiding it after having shown it, or putting it in another cage.

Another common control is effort control. Does it matter if the food is handed out as a reward for effort or simply as a gift? Most commonly used for effort is Brosnan and De Waal's token-exchange task. Sometimes subjects must hold on to a token for a specified period of time (a task referred to as "target"). For no effort there are two cases: neither animal has to do anything, or the partner gets a free gift but the subject has to complete a task.

==== Ultimatum Game ====
A few studies have deviated from the token-exchange paradigm and followed a paradigm used in inequity experiments with humans, the Ultimatum Game. In this game, one individual, the proposer, has to choose between two tokens, one representing a fair division of rewards, the other an unfair division. The other individual, the responder, then needs to decide to either accept the chosen token, in which case rewards are given as per token value, or reject the token, in which case both proposer and responder do not get any reward.

==== Choice ====
Some studies give the subject a choice between two options with different rewards, typically one in which both animals get rewarded and one in which only the chooser gets rewarded. This could be a direct choice between food plates on sliding platforms, or indirect, typically a choice between two different tokens, but also for example between two pathways that lead to different rewards.

==== Cooperative pulling ====
Within the cooperative pulling paradigm, an experimental design in which two or more animals pull rewards towards themselves via an apparatus that they cannot successfully operate alone, researchers have varied the rewards for participants. They compare the likelihood of animals cooperating again after both received the same reward for jointly pulling to that of one receiving more than the other, or even one receiving all and the other none. This division can be done by the experimenter (one bowl each) or by the animals (one bowl).

== Findings ==
=== Overview ===
The results and conclusions are mixed. Mixed results are not uncommon in research in moral behavior of animals. The results of prosocial experiments, which also aim to explore fairness in animals, are mixed as well. In terms of refusal rates being higher in inequity conditions than equity, there is substantial variation across species, within species, and even across individuals within the same studies. In studies that did find a relatively higher refusal rate in the inequity condition than in the control conditions, there were always some individuals that did not refuse at all.

Researchers have concluded disadvantageous inequity aversion is present in capuchin monkeys, chimpanzees, crows, dogs, macaques, marmosets, mice, rats, ravens, and wolves, although ravens and wolves each were part of only a single study. For capuchin monkeys, chimpanzees, crows, dogs, and marmosets, some studies concluded they were not inequity averse. From an inconclusive study with baboons and gibbons, a researcher concluded that they may be inequity averse, as gorillas may be, although another gorilla study found no evidence. Bonobos also may be equity averse according to Brosnan and De Waal in their interpretation of results from other scientists who concluded they are not. Orangutans, squirrel monkeys, owl monkeys, tamarins, parrots, and cleaner fish were not found to be sensitive to inequity in any study.

The first follow-up studies that failed to replicate the original Brosnan and de Waal findings subsequently were shown to have a crucial difference in experimental setup. They involved animals getting food for no effort. Later studies have shown that the effect disappears in this context. Talbot, Parrish, Watzek, Essler, Leverett, Paukner, and Brosnan argue that it is likely that the results are mixed because of small procedural differences. They acknowledge that controlling for this is hard, especially across species as procedures often have to be tailored to the species in question, for instance in terms of their size and natural behavior. Other factors that may affect outcome but have not always been controlled for are gender and rank. Some researchers have suggested inequity may exist in one population but not another. Many studies mention their small sample size puts limits on their conclusions.

Studies that controlled for contrast effects ruled out that the higher refusal rates were due to mere visibility of better rewards. This is in line with the finding that animals reliably perform tasks for lesser rewards even when better ones are immediately in front of them. A few species (e.g., squirrel monkeys) respond more strongly to contrast effects than inequity; some respond to both (rhesus macaques), some seem indifferent to either condition (orangutans), and some respond more strongly to inequity. Not all scientists have explained reward refusal as equity aversion. Engelmann, Clift, Herrmann, and Tomasello concluded from their experiments with chimpanzees that refusal is due to disappointment in the behavior of the human experimenter, not the behavior of the other animal. Sheskin, Ashayeri, Skerry, and Santos found no evidence that capuchins differentiated between experimenters who either distribute equal rewards or unequal ones. McGetrick, Peters, Korath, Feitsch, Siegmann, and Range found that perceptions of reward attainability influenced dogs' behavior in a paw task with 20 pet dogs. They recommended future experimental procedures to account for this factor.

Physical proximity is an essential ingredient for inequity aversion to appear in effortful tasks. Across species the effect virtually disappears if the animals are not side by side with full visibility of the action. Dominance rank, sex, the quality of the relationship, and reward characteristics all also influence the presence or strength of the reaction. For example, within an established group of chimpanzees inequity aversion was less pronounced than in a newly formed group. And the difference in value between the higher and lower reward matters for capuchins, as does the quality of the reward but not the quantity. Having a barrier between the capuchins or not did not make any difference.

Only three studies have found evidence for advantageous inequity aversion, two with chimpanzees and one with capuchins. In a study of baboons, a few individuals exhibited advantageous inequity aversion, but not enough to draw conclusions about the species. Although in previous studies with chimpanzees it had never been observed, in a 2010 study with 16 captive adult chimpanzees, males and females, it was found chimpanzees that received a higher-value grape refused to participate more often when the other chimpanzee received an inferior carrot than they did when the other chimpanzee also received a grape. On the other hand, there have been a few reports of advantaged primates showing no empathy for their disadvantaged partner but instead eating their rejected lower-value food as well.

Some researchers have questioned the ecological validity of the results of inequity aversion experiments, including their own. For many species cooperation typically occurs outside of the food domain. But all experiments testing for inequity aversion are with food.

List of research by species
Species	Task	Disadvantageous	Advantageous	Researchers
Baboon	Target	Maybe	Maybe	Feller (2016)
Bonobo	None	No	–	Bräuer et al. (2006)
Bonobo	Exchange	Maybe	–	Bräuer et al. (2009)
Bonobo	Ultimatum Game	No	No	Kaiser et al. (2012)
Capuchin	Exchange	Yes	–	Brosnan & de Waal (2003)
Capuchin	None	No	–	Roma et al. (2006)
Capuchin	Choice	No	–	Dubreuil et al. (2006)
Capuchin	Exchange	Yes	–	van Wolkenten et al. (2007)
Capuchin	Exchange	No	–	Fontenot et al. (2007)
Capuchin	None	No	–	Dindo & de Waal (2007)
Capuchin	Pulling	Yes	–	Fletcher (2008)
Capuchin	Exchange	No	–	Silberberg et al. (2009)
Capuchin	Pulling	Yes	Yes	Takimoto et al. (2010)
Capuchin	Choice	No	–	Sheskin et al. (2014)
Capuchin	Choice	No	No	McAuliffe et al. (2015)
Capuchin	Exchange	Yes	–	Talbot et al. (2018)
Capuchin	Exchange	No	–	Rocha et al. (2020)
Chimpanzee	Exchange	Yes	–	Brosnan et al. (2005)
Chimpanzee	None	No	–	Bräuer et al. (2006)
Chimpanzee	Ultimatum Game	–	No	Jensen et al. (2007)
Chimpanzee	Exchange	No	–	Bräuer et al. (2009)
Chimpanzee	Exchange	Yes	Yes	Brosnan et al. (2010)
Chimpanzee	Ultimatum Game	No	No	Kaiser et al. (2012)
Chimpanzee	Ultimatum Game	–	Yes	Proctor et al. (2013)
Chimpanzee	Exchange	Yes	–	Hopper et al. (2014)
Chimpanzee	Pulling	No	No	Ulber et al. (2017)
Chimpanzee	Choice	Yes	–	Engelmann et al. (2017)
Chimpanzee	None	Yes	–	Kim et al. (2018)
Chimpanzee	Ultimatum Game	No	No	Bueno-Guerra et al. (2019)
Cleaner fish	Choice	No	–	Raihani et al. (2012)
Crow	Exchange	Yes	–	Wascher & Bugnyar (2013)
Crow	Exchange	No	–	Jelbert et al. (2015)
Dog	Action	Yes	–	Range et al. (2009)
Dog	Action	Yes	–	Range et al. (2012)
Dog	Choice	No	No	Horowitz (2012)
Dog	Action	Yes	–	Brucks et al. (2016)
Dog	Action	No	–	Brucks et al. (2017)
Dog (pack)	Action	No	–	Essler et al. (2017)
Dog	Action	Yes	–	McGetrick et al. (2019)
Dog	Action	Yes	–	Romero et al. (2019)
Dog	Action	Yes	–	McGetrick et al. (2020)
Dog	Action	Yes	–	McGetrick et al. (2023)
Gibbon	Target	Maybe	No	Feller (2016)
Gorilla	None	No	–	Bräuer et al. (2006)
Gorilla	Exchange	Maybe	No	Feller (2016)
Macaque	Pulling	Yes	No	Massen et al. (2012)
Macaque	Target	Yes	–	Hopper et al. (2013)
Marmoset	Target	No	No	Freeman et al. (2013)
Marmoset	Pulling	Yes	–	Mustoe et al. (2016)
Marmoset	Target	Yes	–	Yasue et al. (2018)
Mouse	None	Yes	No	Watanabe (2019)
Mouse	None	Yes	–	Ueno et al. (2019)
Orangutan	None	No	–	Bräuer et al. (2006)
Orangutan	Exchange	No	–	Bräuer et al. (2009)
Orangutan	Exchange	No	No	Brosnan et al. (2011)
Orangutan	Exchange	No	No	Feller (2016)
Orangutan	None	No	–	Kim et al. (2018)
Owl monkey	Target	No	No	Freeman et al. (2013)
Parrot	Exchange	No	–	Heaney et al. (2017)
Parrot	Exchange	No	–	Krasheninnikova et al. (2019)
Parrot	Exchange	No	–	Laumer et al. (2019)
Rat	Choice	Yes	–	Hernandez-Lallement et al. (2015)
Rat	Choice	Yes	–	Oberliessen et al. (2016)
Raven	Exchange	Yes	–	Wascher & Bugnyar (2013)
Squirrel monkey	Exchange	No	No	Talbot et al. (2011)
Squirrel monkey	Target	No	No	Freeman et al. (2013)
Squirrel monkey	Pulling	Yes	—	Bucher et al. (2020)
Tamarin	Exchange	No	No	Neiworth et al. (2009)
Tamarin	Pulling	No	No	McAuliffe et al. (2014)
Wolf	Action	Yes	No	Essler et al. (2017)

=== Primates ===
==== Baboons ====
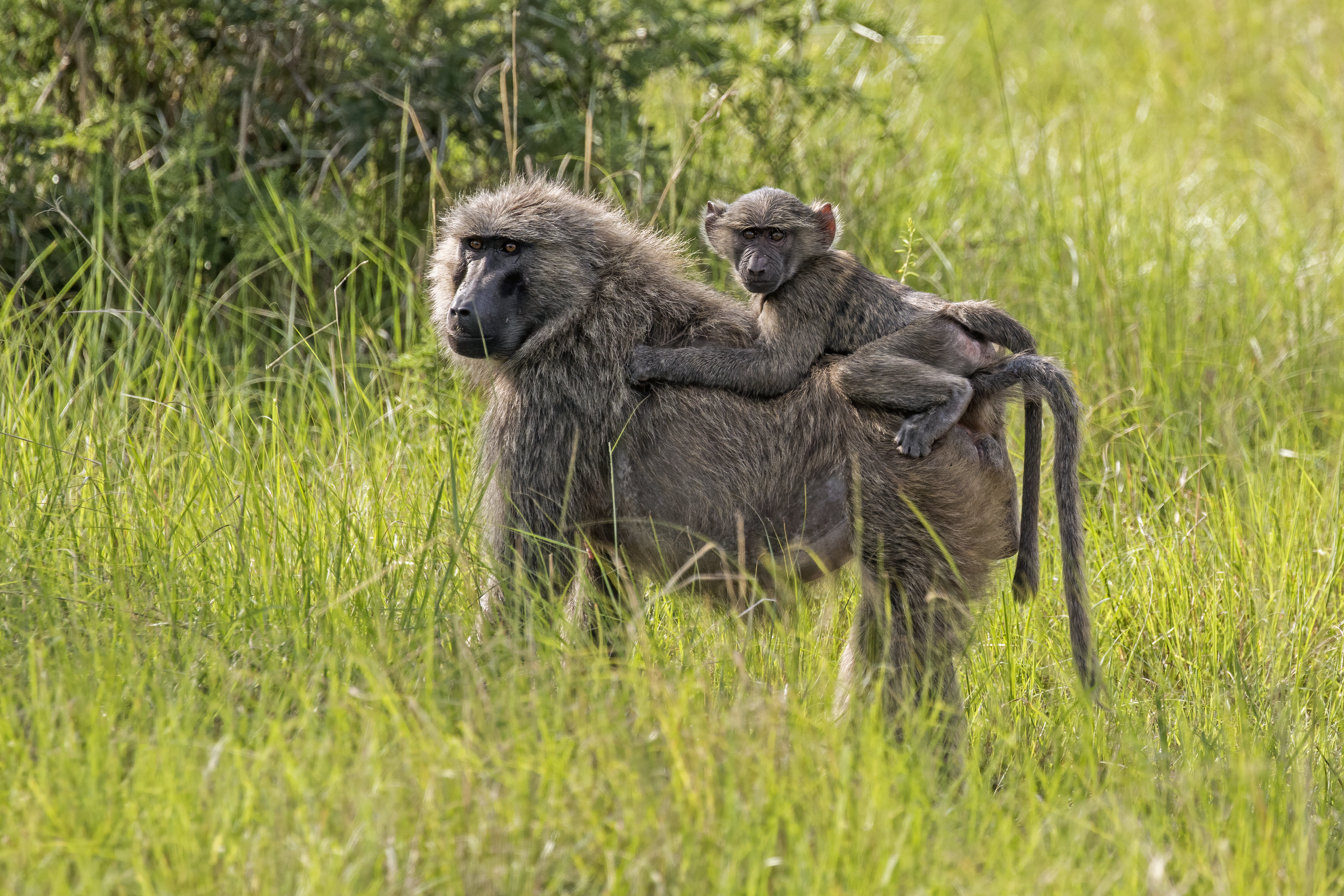
Olive baboons

Baboons live in complex societies of up to 150 individuals. They are tolerant and cooperative. Feller tested 12 olive baboons (Papio anubis) in pairs that had not been exposed to each other before. Both apes had to pick up and hold a target for 1 second to be rewarded. Rewards were either identical, inferior or superior in either quality or quantity. On average the baboons' refusal rate in the inequity conditions (both quality and quantity) differed significantly from the equity control conditions, but it did not differ significantly from the contrast control conditions, making it not possible to rule out a non-social reason for their behavior. However, there were striking individual differences. Five baboons had dramatically higher refusal rates in the quality inequity condition than in the quality contrast conditions. For quantity inequity this number was four. Demographic variables such as sex, rank, and rearing history could not explain why some individuals were inequity averse and others not. As for advantageous inequity aversion, three baboons showed the effect for quality and one for quantity.

==== Bonobos ====
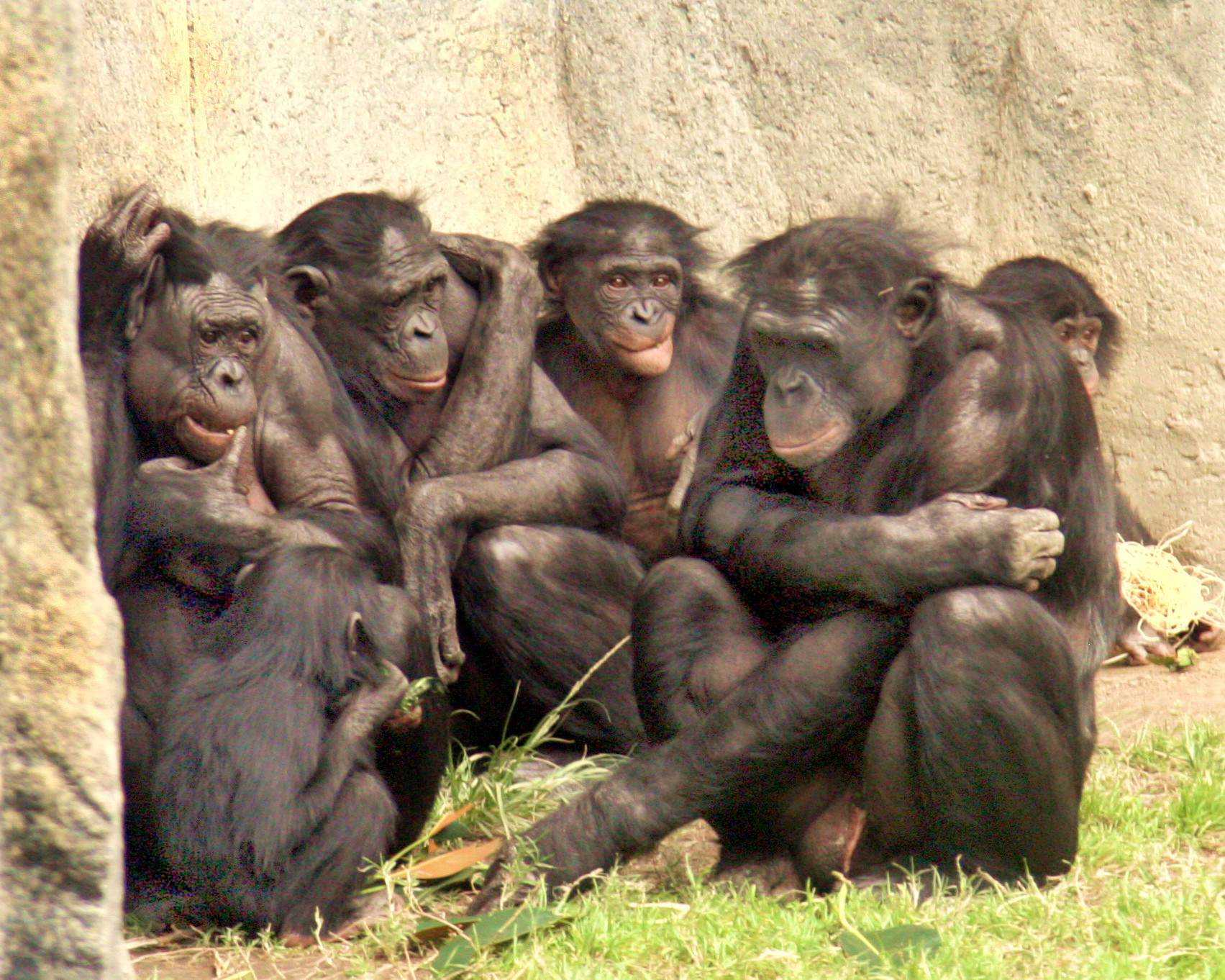
Bonobos

Bonobos (Pan paniscus) are social animals that live in hierarchical structures, though not as hierarchical as chimpanzees. Researchers Bräuer, Call, and Tomasello tested bonobos, together with other great apes, twice and twice failed to find evidence of inequity aversion. In the first study the apes were simply given food. Three years later they made a few procedural changes, critically now using the token-exchange paradigm. They argued that because in their method apes in the equity condition were shown the higher-value reward prior to receiving the lower-value reward, only their method allowed for proper comparison between inequity and equity conditions. Although all five bonobos refused lower-value food more often after having seen a partner getting a better reward, the researchers concluded that there was no sufficient evidence to say bonobos are inequity averse. Brosnan and de Waal drew different conclusions from the Bräuer, Call, and Tomasello study and wrote that bonobos may be inequity averse. Kaiser, Jensen, Call, and Tomasello designed a variant of the Ultimatum Game that involved inequity being created by the proposer stealing a portion of the responder's share. They did not find any bonobo refusing any food, and proposers consistently stole food from responders, seemingly oblivious to the effect theft would have on others. They concluded bonobos are insensitive to unfairness.

==== Capuchins ====
After the original Brosnan and de Waal paper almost a dozen studies with capuchins (Sapajus apella) have been published. The results of these studies are mixed, with some confirming the original finding that capuchins are inequity averse and others failing to replicate the finding and thus concluding they are not. McAuliffe, Chang, Leimgruber, Spaulding, Blake, and Santos, for example, found no evidence of either disadvantageous or advantageous inequity aversion in a choice experiment often used with humans. Talbot, Parrish, Watzek, Essler, Leverett, Paukner, and Brosnan argued that the results had been mixed because the experimental setups differ and even small details might influence the capuchins' behavior. To test this they investigated two factors that differ across the capuchin studies. They gave 13 capuchins the token-exchange task and varied the quality of food. They introduced a medium-preferred food reward and found that the effect is far stronger when the difference in food preference is large (i.e. high and low) than medium (e.g., high and medium), and that it disappears if the low-value food is not much liked at all. This outcome may explain some of the mixed results of previous experiments. They also tested the impact of having a physical barrier between the two monkeys or not, another factor that had varied in the experiments so far. They found it did not matter if there was one or not. They suggested future studies should control for each detail of the experimental setup, as it helps to understand the effect better, rather than seeing mixed results as a negative. Rocha, de Carvalho, Tavares, and Tonneau investigated if capuchins rejecting less preferred food could be explained by the contrast effect. They tested nine monkeys in a token-exchange experiment with first cucumber, then grapes, and then cucumber again, both alone and in pairs. From the higher rejection rates in the second round with grapes than in the first, and little difference between the social and non-social settings, the researchers concluded capuchins are not inequity averse, but that instead their behavior is the result of a contrast effect.

==== Chimpanzees ====
Chimpanzees (Pan troglodytes) are smart, social apes. In the wild they cooperate to hunt, dominate rival groups, and defend their territory. They share food, but possibly do this to avoid challenges. Results of inequity aversion studies have yielded mixed results. Bräuer, Call, and Tomasello, for instance, provided six chimpanzees with a token-exchange task, controlling for social and food comparison factors. They concluded that any difference in behavior in the inequity condition compared to the equity condition was due to the apes comparing the food on offer, not due to unfairness. On the other hand, Brosnan, Talbot, Ahlgren, Lambeth, and Schapiro administered a similar test to 16 chimpanzees and found that males were inequity averse but females were not. The higher refusal rate in the inequity condition was due to social comparison. The researchers also found the first evidence of advantageous inequity aversion in animals. Multiple times chimpanzees refused a highly preferred reward (grape) after having observed their partner only receive a less preferred reward (carrot). Studies using the Ultimatum Game instead of token exchange also produced mixed results. Five studies involved an experimental setup in which the chimpanzees were not side by side. None of them found any evidence of inequity aversion. Brosnan, Talbot, Ahlgren, Lambeth, and Schapiro attributed overall variability in results to differences in procedures and small sample sizes making it hard to reliably control for factors such as rank and sex.

In a modified version of the Ultimatum Game, researchers gave chimpanzees a choice between a token representing five bananas for them and one for their partner, and a token representing an equal split of three bananas each. They had to pass this token to their partner which could either accept it and have it exchanged into the appropriate reward distribution, or reject it, resulting in nothing for both. Two of the four chimpanzees chose the equity token significantly more often than chance. When comparing their choices to those in a control condition in which their partner had no option to reject the token, all four chimpanzees chose the equity token significantly more often. Respondents never rejected an offer, but they did sometimes protest, for instance by spitting water at the selfish proposer.

==== Gibbons ====
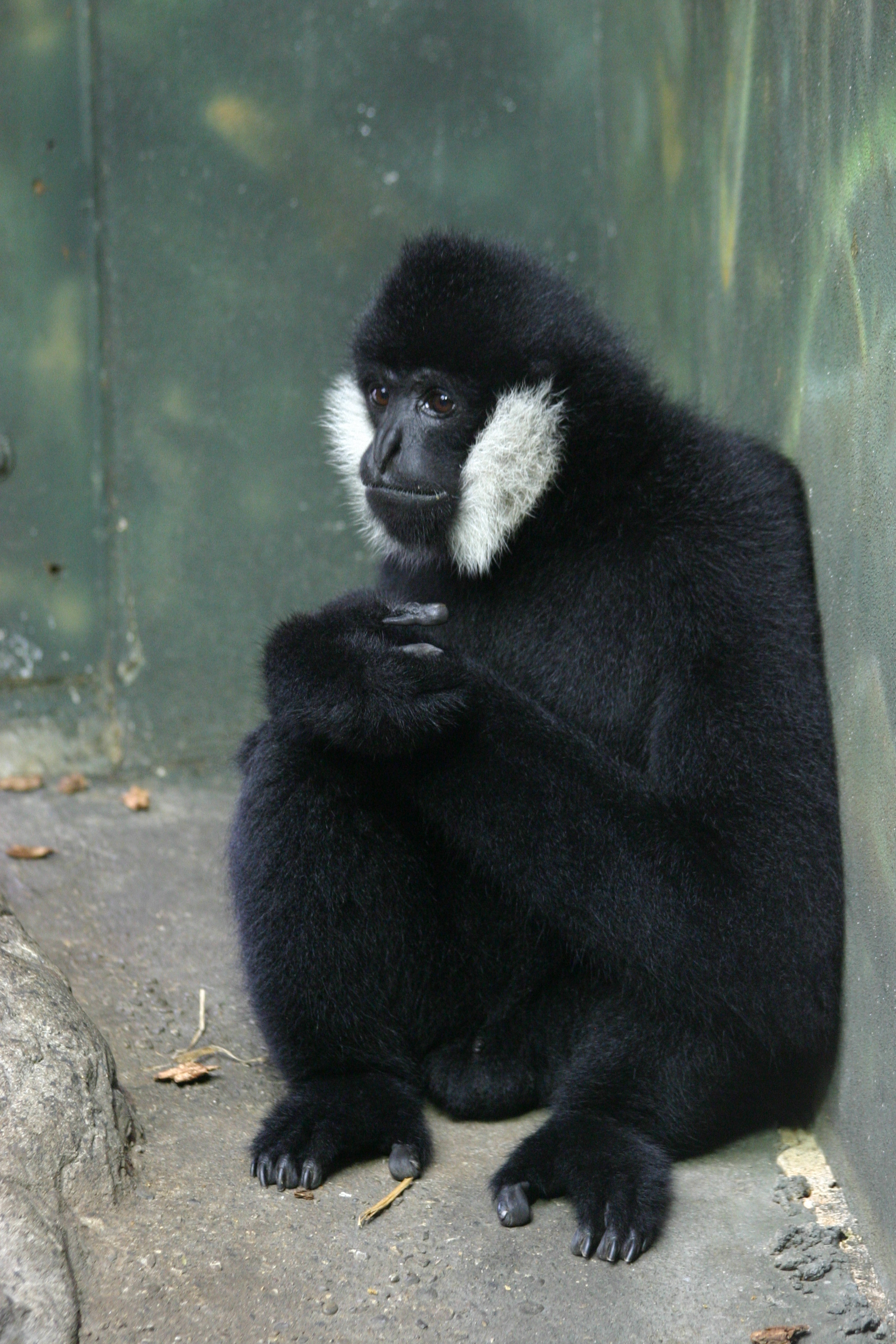
White-cheeked gibbon

Gibbons live in small groups, two parents with their offspring, and do not cooperate with non-kin. Feller tested two white-cheeked gibbons (Nomascus leucogenys) in a target-holding experimental paradigm, predicting that they would not respond negatively to receiving inferior rewards than their partner. Indeed, there was no significant difference with the control conditions, although one of the two gibbons did refuse more than in the equity conditions, both in the case where rewards differed in quality and in the case where they differed in quantity. Feller did not find any contrast effect for gibbons.

==== Gorillas ====
In the wild gorillas live in family groups of on average nine individuals. In an experiment including three other great ape species as well, Bräuer, Call and Tomasello put six gorillas to the inequity test. Apes were given food without having to perform a task. The researchers did not report results specifically for gorillas, but overall for all four species the apes did not refuse food more often when a partner got better food. From their controlled experiments they concluded that any food refusal is not due to inequity aversion but, most likely, to not meeting their expectation. This food expectation hypothesis says that subjects have an expectation to receive the preferred food in some conditions but not others. Seeing the experimenter give favored food to a partner, not just being placed into an empty cage, may have created the expectation that they will get some of the favored food as well. In speculating why their findings are different from Brosnan and de Waal's, Bräuer, Call and Tomasello point to procedural differences, especially giving food versus token exchange. In a token-exchange test with two male gorillas, siblings, Feller did find some evidence of inequity aversion. One of the apes refused food far more often when his partner had received a better value reward for exchanging a token than in the control condition. But since both brothers also reacted to the contrast effect, Feller did neither rule out nor confirm that gorillas are inequity averse.

==== Macaques ====
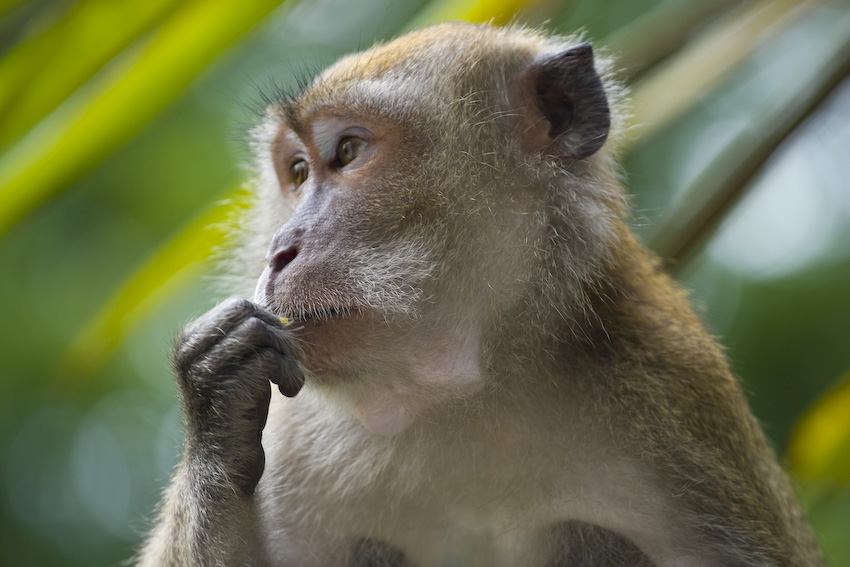
Long-tailed macaque

Macaques are small monkeys that live in hierarchical groups. They do not habitually use tools, hunt cooperatively or share food. Two out of two studies with macaques found evidence for inequity aversion. Massen, Van Den Berg, Spruijt, and Sterck tested 12 long-tailed macaques (Macaca fascicularis) in a tray-pulling experiment with strangers and "friends". The researchers hypothesized that friends pay less attention to equity than strangers and thus they predicted no or only a small effect in the friends condition. Contrary to their predictions, the macaques responded to inequity in largely the same way with a friend as with a stranger. The monkeys only refused food significantly more in the inequity condition when their effort was moderate. No effort or a lot of effort (the tray the subjects had to pull towards themselves was counterweighted extra) did not result in higher refusal rates. The researchers ruled out that refusal rates were higher due to a contrast effect because each individual monkey only ever received one type of reward. No evidence for advantageous inequity aversion was found.

Hopper, Lambeth, Schapiro, Bernacky, and Brosnan were the first researchers to study the development of inequity aversion in animals. They first tested 20 young rhesus macaques (Macaca mulatta) and found no difference in refusal rate between inequity and equity conditions. A year later they tested eight of them again and now found them refusing rewards more often in the inequity condition. They ruled out refusals being due to the animals having been frustrated seeing but not getting the higher-value food.

==== Marmosets ====
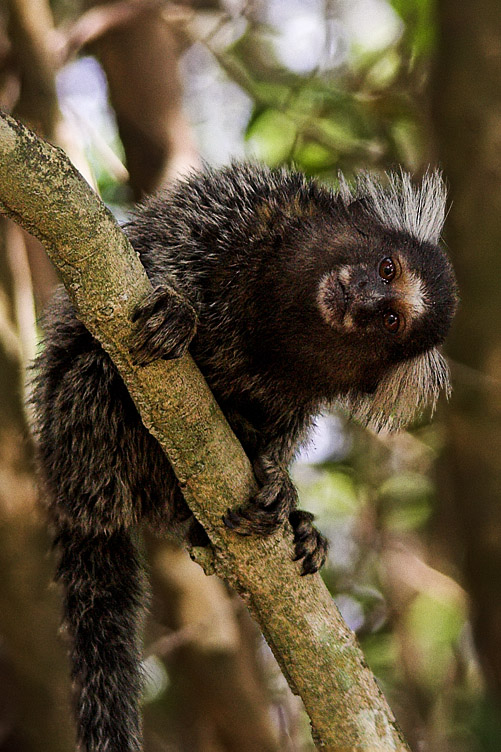
Marmoset

Marmosets (Callithrix) are small monkeys that form long-term parental pair bonds. In two of three experiments with marmosets evidence was found of inequity aversion. Freeman, Sullivan, Hopper, Talbot, Holmes, Schultz-Darken, Williams, and Brosnan found that none of the ten marmosets they tested differed significantly in their rate of refusals among the three task conditions. In contrast, Yasue, Nakagami, Nakagaki, Ichinohe, and Kawai did find a difference in their test of six marmosets required to hold a spoon for two seconds to receive a reward. The monkeys almost always successfully performed the task when they had observed a partner receiving the same reward, but only in 70% of trials when they witnessed the partner receiving a more attractive reward. This high rate was not present in another condition where five other marmosets had been exposed to valproic acid, an epilepsy drug found to increase the risk of autism in humans and used to make models of autism. This lead the researchers to conclude that inequity aversion stems from weak social motivation.

Mustoe, Harnisch, Hochfelder, Cavanaugh, and French tested eight marmosets in a tray-pulling experiment, where subjects pulled a tray with food towards themselves and partners. They found evidence for inequity aversion in the four male marmosets. The males did not avert inequity when paired with strangers. The neurohypophysial hormone oxytocin, which has been found to modulate social behavior in primates, did not influence inequity aversion.

==== Orangutans ====
Five inequity aversion studies involving orangutans (Pongo pygmaeus), a great ape with a semi-solitary lifestyle and not known to be great co-operators, have been published. No study found evidence of inequity aversion. Brosnan, Flemming, Talbot, Mayo, and Stoinski used the same experimental set-up and method as the group had previously used with chimpanzees. Five orangutans were put in eight different conditions, seven of which involved a token exchange. The highest refusal rate, 10%, was in the inequity condition but it did not differ significantly from the refusal rate in the equity conditions, neither the one in which both apes received a low value reward nor the one with a high-value reward. The orangutans also did not refuse often in individual contrast conditions. As with many other species, in the no-effort condition the refusal rate was very low. Feller tested two orangutans with various conditions including a quantity inequity condition. Neither ape refused any food in any condition.

==== Owl monkeys ====
Owl monkeys (Aotus) live in small groups of up to five individuals, usually a male and female and their offspring. Both parents look after the children. Freeman, Sullivan, Hopper, Talbot, Holmes, Schultz-Darken, Williams, and Brosnan tested three different monkey species, including owl monkeys, in a variation of Brosnan and de Waal's original experiment. Instead of exchanging tokens with experimenters the monkeys had to reach out of their cage, pick a token and hold on to it. Apart from the non-social condition with high-value food visible but not given, there also was a no-effort control condition. The researchers found that owl monkeys did not differ in their rate of refusals among any of the four conditions. They hypothesized that for species that provide bi-parental care the cost of having conflict with their reproductive partner may be too high to warrant a refusal reaction over a small amount of inequity.

==== Squirrel monkeys ====
In the wild, squirrel monkeys (Saimiri sciureus) do not regularly cooperate. Talbot, Freeman, Williams, and Brosnan tested squirrel monkeys in a token-for-food exchange experiment, with a free food and contrast conditions as controls. The monkeys did not refuse food more often in the inequity condition than in the equity condition. They refused food far less often in the free food condition than in the token-exchange conditions. The male squirrel monkeys refused food the most in the contrast condition, when given inferior food after initially having been shown better food. The females refused food less often in all conditions, the least in the free-food condition. The researchers concluded that squirrel monkeys are not averse to inequity. Freeman, Sullivan, Hopper, Talbot, Holmes, Schultz-Darken, Williams, and Brosnan found no evidence of inequity aversion in their test with squirrel monkeys either. They too observed a strong contrast effect: when there was no partner but a better reward present than given, the monkeys refused food the most by far. Bucher, Bourgeois, Anderson, Kuroshima and Fujita used an experimental set-up in which squirrel monkeys had to pull a platform with trays, with different quantities and qualities of food, to themselves and a partner. They found no evidence of inequity aversion in males but concluded that females may be inequity averse, although they could not rule out that their behavior was caused by increased arousal caused by out-of-group females. Vale, Williams, Webb, and Schapiro tested female squirrel monkeys in a group setting, questioning the results of previous experiments with just pairs. They found evidence of inequity aversion and concluded that demographic, social context and reward value all may play a role.

==== Tamarins ====
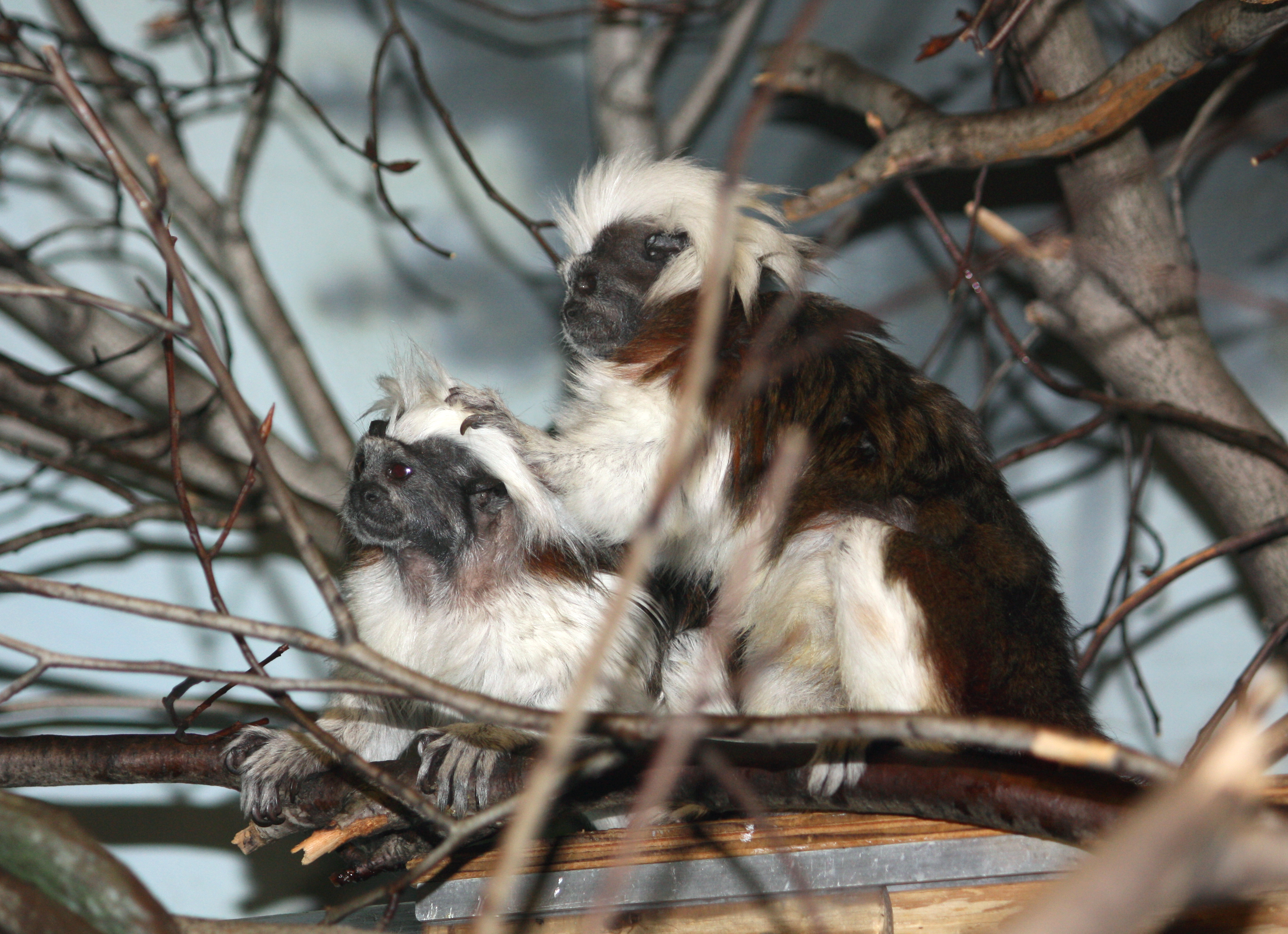
Cotton-top tamarins

Cotton-top tamarins (Saguinus oedipus) are New World monkeys that breed cooperatively, cooperate on tasks and tolerate food sharing. Neiworth, Johnson, Whillock, and Greenberg tested 11 tamarins in six conditions. In one of the conditions, the effort+food inequity condition, the subjects were given the less preferred food as reward for a token exchange, whereas the partners were just handed the more preferred food for no effort. The highest rejection rates were in the food-control condition, with low-value food given while preferred food was present. The researchers did find some evidence of inequity aversion, but only by comparing results from the first set of trials to the last in the food inequity condition of the token-exchange task, similar to Brosnan and de Waal's original analysis. In the non-social conditions this significant rise in rejections was not found. The researchers attributed the rise to an increasing aversion to the perceived inequity. Curiously, in the effort+food inequity condition the rejection rates did not increase significantly. The researchers theorised that the animals judged the situation differently as the partner did not have to act, not triggering the equity comparison scheme.

McAuliffe, Shelton, and Stone tested the reaction of 12 cotton-top tamarins to inequity in a personalised handle-pulling task. The researchers suspected that the amount of effort involved is a key factor in inequity aversion and therefore designed a tray-pulling task with weights, after having calibrated how much weight each subject was willing to pull for food. In the inequity conditions the subjects had to exert a lot of effort for little food while their partners received more food for no effort. The researchers found weak support for the influence of effort on inequity aversion, largely driven by one female.

=== Other mammals ===
==== Dogs ====
Dogs (Canis familiares) are known to cooperate in hunting, breeding and defending territories. In 2018 McGetrick and Range reviewed seven studies into inequity aversion in dogs, involving three different experimental designs and over 140 subjects. They found no consensus among the studies: four found evidence for inequity aversion. Range, Horn, Virányi, and Huber found a negative reaction to an all-or-nothing distribution of rewards, in an experimental setup similar to Brosnan and de Waal's original work, with the task of giving a paw. However, there was no effect when the distribution was uneven in quality. The researchers concluded that dogs possess a primitive form of disadvantageous inequity aversion. Brucks, Essler, Marshall-Pescini, and Range replicated this study with 32 pet dogs and came to the same conclusion, as did Range, Leitner, and Virányi, who also found that dogs with closer relationships with their owners required more paw commands in the inequity situation, suggesting that they disliked the inequity more. Using a buzzer task experiment with ten pack-living dogs, Essler, Marshall-Pescini, and Range found similar results to what the paw-giving studies had found, resulting in the researchers concluding dogs possess a primitive form of inequity aversion. After publication of McGetrick and Range's review, Romero, Konno, Nagasawa, and Hasegawa published their study in which they not only concluded from their experiments with 16 Labrador Retrievers that dogs are inequity averse, but also found that oxytocin modulated the dogs' responses to inequity. Also following the 2018 review, McGetrick, Ausserwöger, Leidinger, Attar, and Range tested the hypothesis that a shared food source is necessary to elicit inequity aversion in dogs, but found that not to be the case. Even when rewards came from different sources they observed some inequity aversion. McGetrick, Peters, Korath, Feitsch, Siegmann, and Range found that perceptions of reward attainability influenced dogs' behavior in a paw task with 20 pet dogs. They recommended future experimental procedures to account for this factor, as it may exaggerate dogs' propensity to give up due to inequity aversion.

Of the studies McGetrick and Range reviewed that failed to find evidence for dogs being inequity averse, they challenged the validity of one of them, a study by Horowitz involving dogs choosing between a fair and an unfair human, on the grounds of it was not asking the same question of the dogs. Brucks, Marshall-Pescini, Essler, McGetrick, Huber, and Range tested the willingness of 44 dogs to press a buzzer with their paw to get a food reward inferior to their partner's. Their experimental setup did include one set of conditions without any human being present. While the dogs did show signs of stress, they did not refuse to perform the task relatively more. They stopped pressing the buzzer once they saw that their partner was being rewarded and they did not, but this behavior was not significantly different from the condition without a partner. McGetrick and Range concluded in 2018 that it is likely that dogs possess a primitive form of disadvantageous inequity aversion.

==== Mice ====
Mice (Mus musculus) are a social species that develop in a hierarchy of organized social groups. In experiments with mice separated by a transparent wall Ueno, Suemitsu, Murakami, Kitamura, Wani, Takahashi, and Ishihara investigated their behaviors under different food allocations: same food, less food, or different quality food. The mice did not have to perform a task. The researchers found that mice given the highest quality food required more time to eat when their partner had received no food. They found no difference in behavior when the other mouse received a lower-quality food. They concluded that their findings suggest that mice recognize and compare others' situation and alter their behavior accordingly. They suggested more research is needed to determine if mice are equity averse. In an experimental set-up measuring body temperature in various conditions, Watanabe aimed to determine if mice are inequity averse. Mice deprived of food and surrounded by feeding mice had an elevated body temperature. Mice with food surrounded by food-deprived cage mates also displayed an increase in body temperature, but this was not significant. Watanabe concluded that the test results showed no evidence of advantageous inequality aversion, but they did indicate the presence of disadvantageous inequality aversion in mice.

==== Rats ====
Rats (Rattus norvegicus) often develop in social groups, cooperate naturally, have been found to reciprocate, and generally display behavior that benefits others. Hernandez-Lallement, van Wingerden, Marx, Srejic, and Kalenscher tested 68 male rats in a series of maze experiments where the animals could choose between a path that led to rewards just for them or for a partner as well. Most rats chose the option that rewarded both significantly more often, albeit with a small margin (55% versus 45%). In a control condition the researchers replaced the partner rat with a toy lookalike. In this condition, the rats chose the option to just reward themselves more often. The researchers concluded that rats derive value from another rat's access to food. They attributed the relatively small size of the effect to individual differences. About 60% of rats showed this pro-social behavior. In a similar experiment with 23 rats, Oberliessen, Hernandez-Lallement, Schable, van Wingerden, Seinstra, and Kalenscher found supporting evidence of inequity aversion.

==== Wolves ====
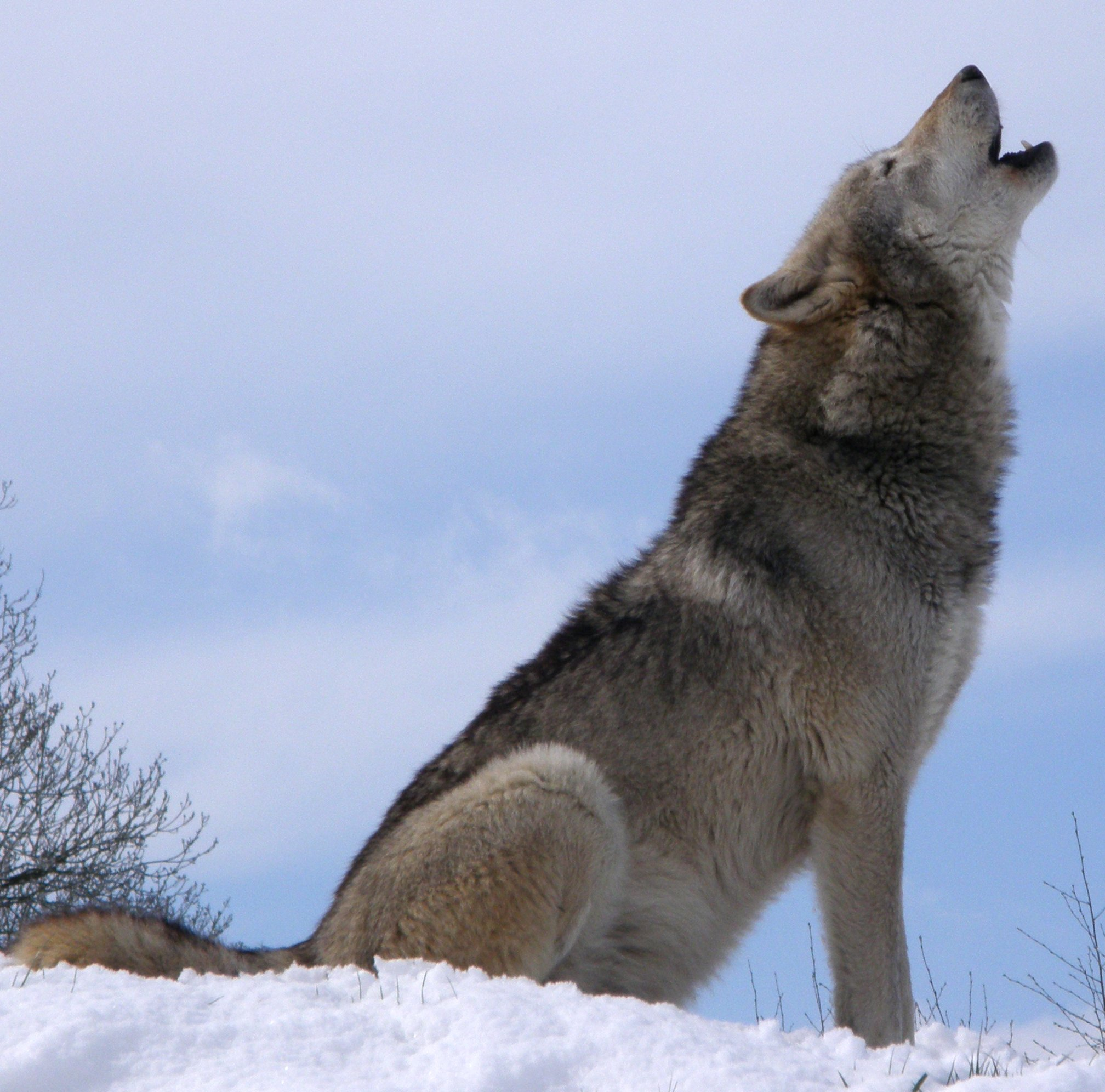
Gray wolf

Wolves (Canis lupus) are highly social animals that cooperate in hunting, breeding and defending their territories. Essler, Marshall-Pescini, and Range set up an experiment with nine wolves and ten pack-living dogs to investigate if domestication was the reason dogs show a primitive form of inequity aversion. The animals had to press a buzzer to receive a reward, which was either equal or inferior to the reward of a partner performing the same action in an adjacent enclosure. The wolves stopped pressing the buzzer once they observed their partner got a better reward for the same action. In the conditions without receiving a reward, wolves completed fewer tasks when there was a partner that did get rewarded than when there was no partner at all. Taking the social hierarchy into account, dominant wolves reacted strongly to a subordinate being rewarded when they were not. Given that the results for pack-living dogs were very similar, the researchers concluded that the common ancestor of wolves and dogs likely already was inequity averse, and that domestication is not a factor for this behavior in dogs.

=== Birds ===
==== Crows ====
Carrion crows (Corvus corone corone) are smart, social birds from the corvid family. Wascher and Bugnyar tested six crows in a setup similar to the original Brosnan and de Waal study (they also tested ravens at the same time). They made sure that the birds always saw the reward before the task, in order to control for a frustration effect. The exchange rate was significantly higher in the equity condition than in the inequity condition, as the researchers had expected. The biggest drop in task completion rate was when the partner received a reward for no effort but the crow had to work for it. Wascher and Bugnyar concluded that crows reject unfair offers. Because of their small sample size they were cautious to attribute this to disadvantageous inequity aversion, but strongly suspected so. Brosnan and de Waal concluded from Wascher and Bugnyar's research that crows are inequity averse.

==== Parrots ====
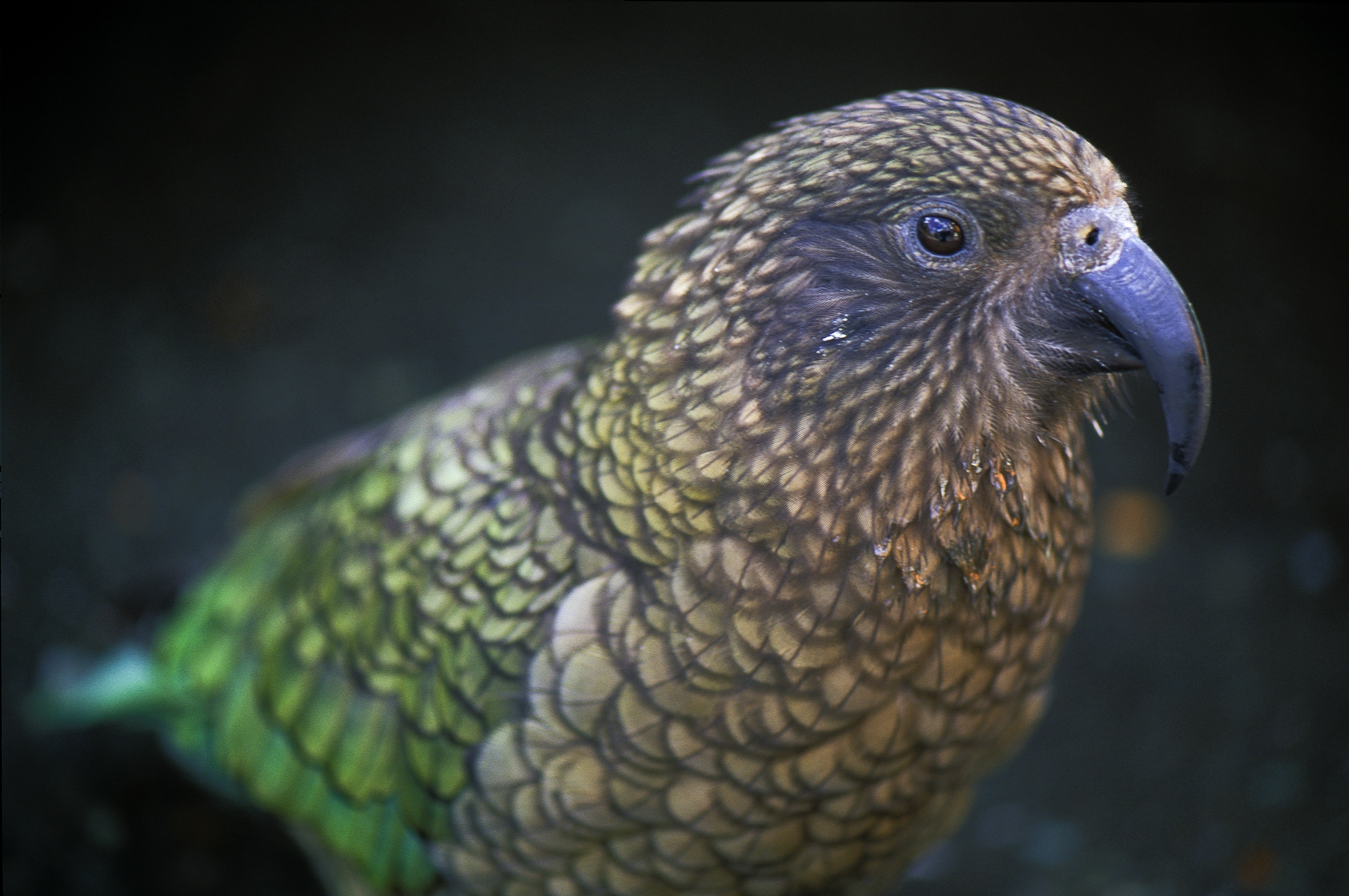
Kea

Parrots generally live in complex social structures and perform well on cognitive tasks. Kea (Nestor notabilis) are parrots that live in groups. Although in lab settings they have displayed cooperative behavior, in the wild they do not appear to cooperate. Researchers Heaney, Gray, and Taylor presented four male kea with a series of token-exchange conditions, with the birds side by side. They found that the success rate did not differ significantly between the four conditions involving rewards (inequity condition, equity condition, free gift condition, and food control condition, in which both kea were shown a high-value food but upon token exchange only received a low-value reward). A significant drop in success rate was observed in the condition where the subject received nothing while the partner did. The researchers concluded that this is not due to any social factor, as the drop in rate was similar to the one observed in the no partner + no reward condition. Based on these results the researchers concluded that kea are not sensitive to inequity. Krasheninnikova, Brucks, Buffenoir, Blanco, Soulet, and von Bayern subjected 28 parrots, of four different species, great green macaws, blue-throated macaws, blue-headed macaws and grey parrots, to token exchange experiments. All of these species form long-term monogamous relationships with a partner, while living in larger family groups. As the researchers expected, they found no evidence of inequity aversion. The great green macaws did stop exchanging tokens, but this was deemed to be due to the mere presence of high-quality rewards rather than to the partner receiving it. All four parrot species seemed to be sensitive to differences in reward quality, strongly suggesting that they were paying attention to what their partners were getting. Researchers Laumer, Massen, Wakonig, Lorck-Tympner, Carminito, and Auersperg found tentative evidence for inequity aversion to unequal work‐effort but not to unequal reward distribution in cockatoos.

==== Ravens ====
Ravens (Corvus corax) are large-brained corvids that in the wild form coalitions and cooperate. Researchers Wascher and Bugnyar tested four ravens on their behavioral response to inequity in a token-exchange task (they also tested crows at the same time). Two ravens never refused food in any condition. Overall, the ravens refused to accept the low-quality reward more often in the inequity condition than in the equity condition. Most striking were the results in the condition were the partner simply was given food but the subject had to work for it. Here the ravens successfully completed the task the least. The researchers made the caveat that their sample size was low and were thus reluctant to come to firm conclusions, but it seemed that ravens reject unfair offers even at a cost to themselves. Brosnan and de Waal concluded from Wascher and Bugnyar's research that ravens are inequity averse.

=== Fish ===
==== Cleaner fish ====
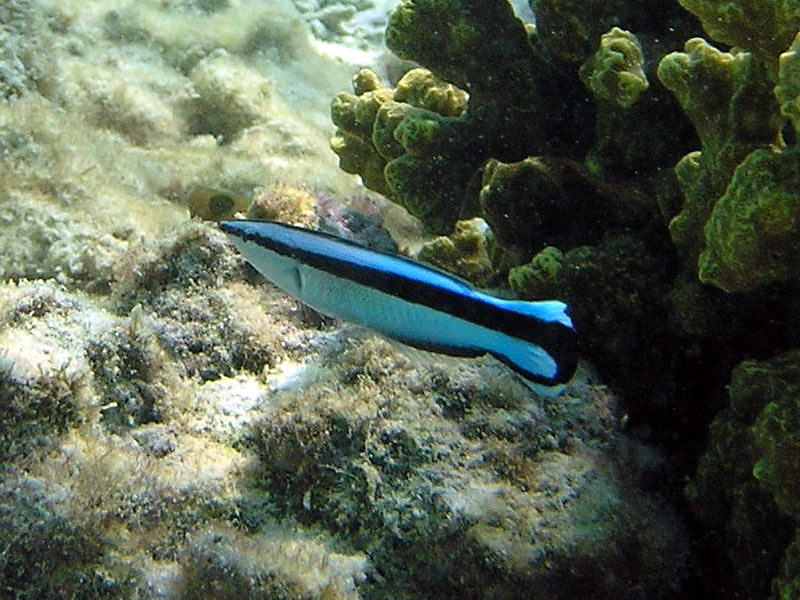
Bluestreak cleaner wrasse

Bluestreak cleaner wrasses (Labroides dimidiatus) are cleaner fish, found in coral reefs, that engage in mutualism with other aquatic animals, so-called clients, by feeding on their surface ectoparasites, mucus and dead skin. Clients prefer having their ectoparasites being removed; they do not like cleaners cheating by biting off surface mucus or dead skin. Sometimes a male and female cleaner wrasse jointly clean a client. Males punish females for cheating because it often results in the end of the feeding session. This suggests cleaner fish may be aware of the payoffs accrued by an interaction partner. Researchers Raihani, McAuliffe, Brosnan, and Bshary tested two sets of cleaner fish (12 and 10 individuals) on their sensitivity to unequal outcomes. The fish had to perform a task to provide food rewards for themselves and a partner. They were equally likely to work when their partner received higher-value rewards or same-value rewards. There was no significant difference whether their partner was unfamiliar and of the opposite sex or familiar and of the same sex. The researchers provided two possible explanations for these results. It may be that the fish did not see or pay attention to the food distribution prior to performing their task. Alternatively, cleaner wrasses may not be inequity averse.

== Evolution ==
Almost all researchers explain the findings of animals refusing less-preferred food while others receive more-preferred food in terms of inequity aversion and a sense of fairness. The cost of foregoing a low-value food when the partner gets a high-value reward is low. It is worth to reject, protest and possibly get something better. The cost of foregoing a high-value food when the partner gets an even higher-value reward is high, not worth protesting about and risk being left empty-handed. Comparing one's gains to those of others makes evolutionary sense. If individuals were satisfied with any absolute benefit, they might still face negative fitness consequences if they were doing less well than competing others. But this applies only in the context of extensive cooperation outside of kinship relationships.

One explanation of the findings so far is that inequity aversion evolves in order to foster long-term cooperation between unrelated individuals. In particular, Brosnan suggests that responding to inequity facilitates partner choice. This increases an individual's fitness by enabling them to reject partnerships which repeatedly lead to unequal outcomes. In support of this, inequity aversion is found in highly-cooperative capuchins, but not in the closely related, less cooperative squirrel monkey; and in cooperative chimpanzees, but not in typically less cooperative orangutans. McAuliffe and Santos however warn that there may be a sampling bias, since far more cooperative species have been tested than less-cooperative ones. A further refinement is that inequity aversion is only adaptive in species which cooperate with multiple partners and can switch cooperative partners without bigger costs, thus ruling out the long-term monogamous parrots. But it fails to explain why no inequity aversion was found in the cooperative cleaner fish. This hypothesis predicts that domestic cats are far less sensitive to inequity than dogs. McGetrick, Brucks, Marshall-Pescini, and Range investigated if there are any differences in behavior between more-cooperative dog breeds and less-cooperative. In an experiment involving 24 dogs they found no evidence for a relationship between breed cooperativeness and inequity aversion.

Brosnan ruled out the possibility that cognitive differences are driving inequity aversion, as orangutans are equally skilful in cognitive and exchange tasks as other great apes but never display the effect. Brosnan and de Waal summarized the findings as inequity aversion being most pronounced in animals that cooperate outside of the bonds of mating and kinship. Chimpanzees, bonobos, capuchins, macaques, dogs and corvids are all highly cooperative in nature and show inequity aversion; orangutans, owl and squirrel monkeys are not cooperative outside kin and do not show inequity aversion.

The main explanation for disadvantageous inequity aversion is anticipatory conflict resolution. The animal anticipates their partner reacting negatively to disadvantageous inequity and thus rejects the better reward, or in the case of the Ultimatum Game, favours the equity token over the favorable one. Researchers have speculated that the reason why it is limited to chimpanzees and capuchins is that it requires the cognitive capability of planning, anticipating their partner's disadvantageous inequity aversion. Few species have this capacity. Chimpanzees have shown their ability to plan ahead in other contexts, for instance in tool use. Advantageous inequity aversion may also directly benefit an individual by enhancing its reputation, which may increase that individual's long-term access to beneficial relationships.

Brauer and Hanus conclude from a review of studies with primates that a sense of fairness is something uniquely human and exists only rudimentarily in non-human primates. They state a sense of fairness is not necessary for cooperation. Humans evolved unique cognitive mechanisms to keep track of individuals' contributions in collaborative activities and to control for cheaters.

Including evidence from canines, Essler, Marshall-Pescini, and Range conclude that it is possible that sensitivity to inequity was already present in an earlier common ancestor with primates. Alternatively, convergent evolution may be at play: under similar conditions the same behavior has emerged multiple times in evolution. Basing their argument partly on the facts that female chimpanzees often range solitarily and avert inequity less than males, Brosnan, Flemming, Talbot, Mayo, and Stoinski state the most likely hypothesis is that natural selection favours those that care how their outcomes compare to others. The level and intensity of cooperation may be less relevant for female chimps than for males, which may reduce the need for the building of social expectations among females. Kim, Choe, Jeong, and Kim state it is an open question whether orangutans have lost or chimpanzees have acquired a sense of fairness in the hominid lineage.

McAuliffe and Santos conclude that there is weak evidence for the social hypothesis for how inequity aversion came about and indirect evidence for the non-social hypothesis. They suspect inequity aversion has non-social roots but has been coopted for social interaction. In their review of studies into the cognitive abilities of parrots and corvids, Lambert, Jacobs, Osvath and von Bayern conclude it is simply too early to make any conclusions about the relationship between inequity aversion and cooperation.

While the controlled experiments have advanced the understanding of inequity aversion, their context cannot include all possible outcomes that exist in natural social interactions. In the standard inequity task, refusals only hurt the actor, whereas in a natural social context, protest against inequity may lead to the actor either receiving a larger share or seeking out a better partner to work with.

Debove, Baumard, and André ran computer simulations of individuals of different rank cooperating with equal and unequal reward distributions and concluded that when partner choice is a characteristic of the setup, fairness emerges.
