= Jessica Flack =

Data scientist

Jessica C. Flack
- Education: Emory University
- Scientific career
- Workplaces: Santa Fe Institute
- Thesis: Robustness mechanisms in primate societies: A study of conflict management, status signaling, and social power in pigtailed macaque society (2003)
- Doctoral advisor: Frans de Waal

Jessica C. Flack is a data scientist, evolutionary biologist, and former professor at the Santa Fe Institute.

== Education and career ==
Jessica Flack attended Cornell University for her undergraduate studies and graduated in 1996 with a Bachelor of the Arts (Honors Degree). She received her PhD from Emory University in 2003, where she studied cognitive science, animal behavior and evolutionary theory. Following her Ph.D. she moved to the Santa Fe Institute as a postdoctoral fellow, and studied complexity science, collective behavior, and robustness from 2004 to 2007.

In 2011 she moved to the University of Wisconsin, Madison to help found and direct the Center of Complexity & Collective Computation in the Wisconsin Institute for Discovery. Following her work in Wisconsin, she went back to the Santa Fe Institute. Flack also acted as the director for the Collective Computation Group at SFI, and served as the chair of public events. She performed much of her research at SFI in collaboration with co-director David Krakauer.

== Research ==
Flack is known for her work connecting the behavior of individuals to group activity. She has used animals, particularly macaque monkeys, to examine group behavior. Flack's early work examined social rules within chimpanzees. Her work with macaque revealed that fights within a group improve group's ability to make decisions, a process Flack calls collective computation. She has also used macaque to examine conflict resolution and social structure.

== Selected publications ==
- Flack, Jessica C.; Girvan, Michelle; de Waal, Frans B. M.; Krakauer, David C. (2006). "Policing stabilizes construction of social niches in primates". Nature. 439 (7075): 426–429. Bibcode:2006Natur.439..426F. doi:10.1038/nature04326. ISSN 0028-0836. PMID 16437106. S2CID 4416675.
- Flack, J.C.; de Waal, F.B.M. (2000-01-01). "'Any animal whatever'. Darwinian building blocks of morality in monkeys and apes". Journal of Consciousness Studies. 7 (1–2): 1–29.
- Flack, Jessica C. (2012-07-05). "Multiple time-scales and the developmental dynamics of social systems". Philosophical Transactions of the Royal Society B: Biological Sciences. 367 (1597): 1802–1810. doi:10.1098/rstb.2011.0214. PMC 3367696. PMID 22641819.
