= The Ape and the Sushi Master =

2001 book by Frans de Waal

The Ape and the Sushi Master: Cultural Reflections by a Primatologist
- First U.S. edition
- Author: Frans de Waal
- Language: English
- Subject: Animal Behavior
- Genre: Science
- Publisher: Basic Books
- Publication date: 2001
- Publication place: United States
- Media type: Paperback
- ISBN: 978-0465041756

The Ape and the Sushi Master: Cultural Reflections by a Primatologist is a popular science book by Frans de Waal. It is an overview of animal behavior and psychology, with an emphasis on primates.

It places a special emphasis on the anthropomorphological traits of primates of several different species. It also includes a short history of anthropomorphology and some of that field's pioneers. The title is meant to reflect an analogy between how primates learn and the cultural process of how sushi-making skills are passed down from master to apprentice.

== Publication data ==
- de Waal, Frans (2001). The Ape and the Sushi Master: Cultural Reflections by a Primatologist (1st ed.). New York: Basic Books. ISBN 978-0465041756.
