= Frans de Waal =

Dutch primatologist and ethologist (1948–2024)

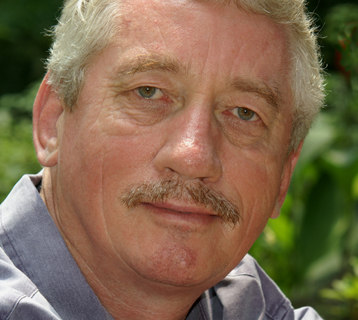
- De Waal in 2006
- Born: Franciscus Bernardus Maria de Waal; 29 October 1948 's-Hertogenbosch, North Brabant, Netherlands
- Died: 14 March 2024 (aged 75); Stone Mountain, Georgia, U.S.
- Scientific career
- Fields: Primatology, ethology
- Workplaces: Emory University
- Thesis: An ethological analysis of types of agonistic interaction in a captive group of Java-monkeys (1976)
- Doctoral advisor: Jan van Hooff
- Doctoral students: Jessica Flack

Franciscus Bernardus Maria de Waal (29 October 1948 – 14 March 2024) was a Dutch-American primatologist and ethologist. He was the Charles Howard Candler Professor of Primate Behavior in the Department of Psychology at Emory University in Atlanta, Georgia, director of the Living Links Center at the Emory National Primate Research Center, and author of numerous books including Chimpanzee Politics (1982) and Our Inner Ape (2005). His research centered on primate social behavior, including conflict resolution, cooperation, inequity aversion, and food-sharing. He was a member of the United States National Academy of Sciences and the Royal Netherlands Academy of Arts and Sciences.

According to Raymond Corbey's The Metaphysics of Apes, De Waal's work "helped to combat the widespread inclination to see the bad habits of humans as exclusively animal and their good ones as exclusively human."

== Early life and education ==
De Waal was born in 's-Hertogenbosch on 29 October 1948, to Jo and Cis de Waal. He grew up with five brothers in Waalwijk.

He studied at Radboud University Nijmegen, University of Groningen, and Utrecht University in the Netherlands. In 1977, De Waal received his doctorate in biology from Utrecht University after training as a zoologist and ethologist with professor Jan van Hooff, a well-known expert on emotional facial expression in primates. His dissertation, titled "Agonistic interactions and relations among Java-monkeys", concerned aggressive behavior and alliance formation in macaques.

He remarked many times that fellow Dutch biologist and 1973 Nobel Prize co-laureate Niko Tinbergen was an inspiration to his career as a scientist.

== Career ==
In 1975, De Waal began a six-year project on the world's largest captive colony of chimpanzees at the Arnhem Zoo. The study resulted in many scientific papers and the publication of his first book, Chimpanzee Politics, in 1982. This book described primates' planned social strategies. De Waal was the first to introduce the thinking of Machiavelli to primatology, leading to the term Machiavellian intelligence. In the mid 1990’s, the book was included on a reading list for US Republican House freshmen. In his writings, De Waal never shied away from attributing emotions and intentions to his primates, and as such his work inspired the field of primate cognition.

De Waal's early work drew attention to deception and conflict resolution among primates, both of which became major areas of research. At first, his research was controversial. De Waal used the term "reconciliation" to describe reunions after fights, which was initially challenged but came to be accepted with respect to animal behavior. De Waal's later work emphasized nonhuman animal empathy and the origins of morality. His most widely cited paper, written with his former student Stephanie Preston, concerns the evolutionary origin and neuroscience of empathy, not just in primates, but in mammals generally.

In the 1990s, De Waal published a book about his work on bonobos, Bonobo: The Forgotten Ape in 1997, including details on bonobo's colorful sex lives. This work, including a 1995 Scientific American article, helped popularize bonobos. In mainstream media, bonobos developed a "make love – not war" reputation.

De Waal's larger goal was understanding what binds primate societies together rather than how competition structures them. However, competition is not ignored in his work: the original focus of de Waal's research was aggressive behavior and social dominance. Whereas his research focused on the behavior of nonhuman primates (mostly chimpanzees, bonobos, macaques, and capuchin monkeys), his popular books gave de Waal worldwide visibility by relating the insights he has gained from monkey and ape behavior to human society. With his students, he also worked on elephants, which were increasingly featured in his writings.

De Waal's research into the innate capacity for empathy among primates led him to the conclusion that non-human great apes and humans are simply different types of apes, and that empathic and cooperative tendencies are continuous between these species. His belief is illustrated in the following quote from The Age of Empathy: "We start out postulating sharp boundaries, such as between humans and apes, or between apes and monkeys, but are in fact dealing with sand castles that lose much of their structure when the sea of knowledge washes over them. They turn into hills, leveled ever more, until we are back to where evolutionary theory always leads us: a gently sloping beach."

This is quite opposite to the view of some economists and anthropologists, who postulate the differences between humans and other animals. However, recent work on prosocial tendencies in apes and monkeys supports de Waal's position. See, for example, the research of Felix Warneken, a psychologist at the Max Planck Institute for Evolutionary Anthropology in Leipzig, Germany. In 2011, de Waal and his co-workers were the first to report that chimpanzees given a free choice between helping only themselves or helping themselves plus a partner, prefer the latter. In fact, de Waal does not believe these tendencies to be restricted to humans and apes, but views empathy and sympathy as universal mammalian characteristics, a view that over the past decade has gained support from studies on rodents and other mammals, such as dogs. He and his students have extensively worked on such cooperation and fairness in animals. In 2011 de Waal gave a TED Talk entitled "Moral behavior in animals". Part of the talk dealt with inequity aversion among capuchin monkeys, and a video extract of this went viral. It showed the furious reaction of one monkey given a less desirable treat than another. The most recent work in this area was the first demonstration that given a chance to play the ultimatum game, chimpanzees respond in the same way as children and human adults by preferring the equitable outcome.

In 1981, de Waal moved to the United States for a position at the Wisconsin National Primate Research Center, and in 1991 took a position at Emory University, in Atlanta, Georgia. He was C.H. Candler Professor in the Psychology Department at Emory University and director of the Living Links Center at the Yerkes National Primate Research Center at Emory. He became an American citizen in 2008.

In 2005 he coined the term Veneer theory. His 2013 book The Bonobo and the Atheist examines human behavior through the eyes of a primatologist, and explores to what extent God and religion are needed for human morality. The main conclusion is that morality comes from within, and is part of human nature. The role of religion is secondary.

De Waal also wrote a column for Psychologie Magazine, a popular Dutch monthly.

From 1 September 2013, de Waal was a distinguished professor (universiteitshoogleraar) at Utrecht University. This was a part-time appointment whilst he remained in his position at Emory University, in Atlanta.

In October 2016, de Waal was the guest on the BBC Radio Four program The Life Scientific.

In June 2018, de Waal was awarded the NAT Award, established by the Museum of Natural Sciences of Barcelona. It was awarded to de Waal "for his vision regarding the evolution of animal behaviour in establishing a parallel between primate and human behaviour in aspects such as politics, empathy, morality and justice."

At least two of de Waal’s later books, Are We Smart Enough to Know How Smart Animals Are? (2016) and Mama’s Last Hug: Animal Emotions and What They Tell Us About Ourselves (2019), were best sellers. Different: Gender through the Eyes of a Primatologist (2022) was a Kirkus Best Science and Medicine Book of 2022.

De Waal died of stomach cancer on 14 March 2024 in Stone Mountain, Georgia. He was 75.

== Awards ==
- 2021 Doctor Honoris Causa, Université Jean-Monnet-Saint-Étienne (France)
- 2020 PEN / EO Wilson Literary Science Writing Award (US)
- 2018 Doctor Honoris Causa, Yale University (US)
- 2018 NAT Award for the Dissemination of Natural Science, Barcelona (Spain)
- 2017 Doctor Honoris Causa, Radboud University (Netherlands)
- 2015 ASP Distinguished Primatologist (American Society of Primatologists)
- 2015 Eugène Dubois Chair, Maastricht University (Netherlands)
- 2014 Galileo Prize (Premio Letterario Galileo), Padua (Italy)
- 2013 Edward O. Wilson Biodiversity Technology Pioneer Award
- 2013 Foreign Member, Royal Holland Society of Sciences and Humanities
- 2013 Doctor Honoris Causa, Utrecht University (Netherlands)
- 2012 Ig Nobel Prize winner, in the Anatomy category
- 2011 Discover magazine's "47 (all time) Great Minds of Science"
- 2011 Doctor Honoris Causa, Colgate University (US)
- 2010 Knight of the Order of the Netherlands Lion
- 2009 Medal, Società di Medicina & Scienze Naturali, Parma (Italy)
- 2009 Ariëns Kappers Medal, Royal Netherlands Academy of Arts and Sciences
- 2009 Doctor Honoris Causa, University for Humanistics (Netherlands)
- 2008 Member of the American Academy of Arts and Sciences (AAAS)
- 2007 Time 100 world's most influential people
- 2005 Member of the American Philosophical Society (APS)
- 2005 Arthur W. Staats Award, American Psychological Foundation
- 2004 Member of the (US) National Academy of Sciences (NAS)
- 1993 Corresponding member of the Royal Netherlands Academy of Arts and Sciences (KNAW)
- 1989 Los Angeles Times Book Award for Peacemaking among Primates

== Selected bibliography ==
=== Books ===
- Chimpanzee Politics: Power and Sex Among Apes. New York: Harper & Row, 1982.
- Peacemaking Among Primates. Cambridge: Harvard University Press, 1989. ISBN 0-674-65920-1
- Chimpanzee Cultures, Edited with Richard Wrangham, W.C. McGrew, and Paul Heltne. Foreword by Jane Goodall. Cambridge: Harvard University Press, 1994. ISBN 0-674-11662-3.
- Good Natured: The Origins of Right and Wrong in Humans and Other Animals. Cambridge: Harvard University Press, 1996. ISBN 0-674-35660-8
- Bonobo: The Forgotten Ape. Berkeley: University of California Press, 1997. ISBN 0-520-20535-9 (with Frans Lanting)
- Chimpanzee Politics: Power and Sex Among Apes (revised ed.). Baltimore, Md.: Johns Hopkins University Press, 1998.
- Natural Conflict Resolution. 2000 (with Filippo Aureli)
- Tree of Origin: What Primate Behavior Can Tell Us about Human Social Evolution, Harvard University Press, 2001. ISBN 0-674-00460-4.
- The Ape and the Sushi Master, Cultural reflections by a primatologist. New York: Basic Books, 2001. ISBN 0-465-04175-2
- Animal Social Complexity: Intelligence, Culture, and Individualized Societies, Edited with Peter L. Tyack. Cambridge: Harvard University Press, 2003. ISBN 0-674-00929-0.
- My Family Album, Thirty Years of Primate Photography 2003.
- Our Inner Ape. New York: Riverhead Books, 2005. ISBN 1-57322-312-3
- Primates and Philosophers: How Morality Evolved, 2006. ISBN 0-691-12447-7
- Chimpanzee Politics: Power and Sex Among Apes (25th Anniversary ed.). Baltimore, Md.: Johns Hopkins University Press, 2007. ISBN 978-0-8018-8656-0.
- The Age of Empathy: Nature's Lessons for a Kinder Society. New York: Crown Publishing Group. 2009. ISBN 9780307407771.
- The Bonobo and the Atheist: In Search of Humanism Among the Primates. New York: W. W. Norton. 2013. ISBN 978-0-393-07377-5.
- Are We Smart Enough to Know How Smart Animals Are?. New York: W. W. Norton. 2016. ISBN 978-0-393-24618-6.
- Mama's Last Hug: Animal Emotions and What They Tell Us about Ourselves. New York: W. W. Norton. 2019. ISBN 978-0-393-63506-5.
- Different: Gender Through the Eyes of a Primatologist. New York: W. W. Norton. 2022. ISBN 978-1-324-00710-4.
- Minds I've Met: From Denying to Embracing the Inner Lives of Animals. New York: W. W. Norton. October 2026. ISBN 978-1324076384.

=== Articles ===
- 2022 de Waal, Frans B.M. and K. Andrews. "The question of animal emotions." Science 375 (6587): 1351–1352. 25 March 2022.
- 2015 Opinion piece about the discovery of Homo naledi in The New York Times
- 2013 Opinion piece about animal intelligence in The Wall Street Journal
- 2010 Opinion piece about God and morality in The New York Times
- 2010 de Waal, Frans B.M.; Ferrari, Pier Francesco (May 2010). "Towards a bottom-up perspective on animal and human cognition". Trends in Cognitive Sciences. 14 (5): 201–207. doi:10.1016/j.tics.2010.03.003. PMID 20363178. S2CID 16459127.
- 2009, de Waal, Frans B. M. (July 2009). "Darwin's last laugh". Nature. 460 (7252): 175. Bibcode:2009Natur.460..175D. doi:10.1038/460175a. PMID 19587747. S2CID 207787993.
- 2008 de Waal, Frans B.M. (January 2008). "Putting the Altruism Back into Altruism: The Evolution of Empathy". Annual Review of Psychology. 59 (1): 279–300. doi:10.1146/annurev.psych.59.103006.093625. PMID 17550343.
- 2007, "Bonobos, Left & Right" Skeptic, (8 August 2007).
- 2006, Plotnik, Joshua M.; de Waal, Frans B. M.; Reiss, Diana (7 November 2006). "Self-recognition in an Asian elephant". Proceedings of the National Academy of Sciences. 103 (45): 17053–17057. doi:10.1073/pnas.0608062103. PMC 1636577. PMID 17075063.
- 2005, "The empathic ape", New Scientist, 8 October 2005
- 2001, "Do Humans Alone 'Feel Your Pain'?" (Chronicle.com, 26 October 2001)
- 1999, de Waal, Frans B. M. (December 1999). "The End of Nature versus Nurture". Scientific American. 281 (6): 94–99. Bibcode:1999SciAm.281f..94D. doi:10.1038/scientificamerican1299-94. JSTOR 26058526. PMID 10614071.
- 1995, de Waal, Frans B. M. (March 1995). "Bonobo Sex and Society The behavior of a close relative challenges assumptions about male supremacy in human evolution". Scientific American. 272 (3): 82–88. S2CID 14326127.

== See also ==
- The Genius of Charles Darwin (Richard Dawkins interviews De Waal)
- The Family of Chimps, a Dutch documentary film based on de Waal's book, Chimpanzee Politics and Our Inner Ape
- Sex at Dawn: the prehistoric origins of modern sexuality by Christopher Ryan and Cacilda Jethá. Harper Collins. 2010.
