= Royal Burgers' Zoo =

Zoo in Arnhem, Netherlands

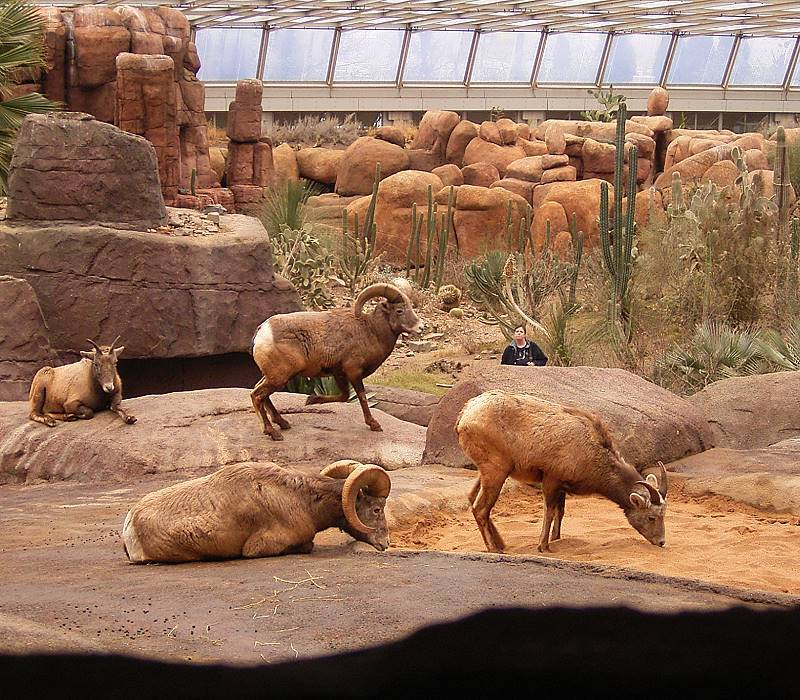
- Bighorn sheep in Burgers' Desert
- Interactive map of Royal Burgers' Zoo
- 52°00′36″N 5°53′59″E
- Location: Arnhem, Netherlands
- Land area: 45 ha (110 acres)
- No. of animals: 10,000+
- No. of species: 500+
- Total volume of tanks: 8,000,000 L (2,100,000 US gal)
- Annual visitors: 1.415 million (2014)
- Memberships: NVD, EAZA, WAZA
- Website: www.burgerszoo.com

Royal Burgers' Zoo (Dutch: Koninklijke Burgers' Zoo) is a 45-hectare (110-acre) zoo in Arnhem, Netherlands, and is one of the biggest zoos in the country. Arnhem is a city that lies partially in the Veluwe, a nature park in the east of the Netherlands. The zoo is popular with both Dutch and German people, and receives about 1 million visitors annually. It was founded by Johan Burgers in 1913.

The zoo is a member of the Dutch Zoo Federation (NVD), the European Association of Zoos and Aquaria (EAZA), the International Species Information System (ISIS), and the World Association of Zoos and Aquariums (WAZA).

== Ecodisplays ==
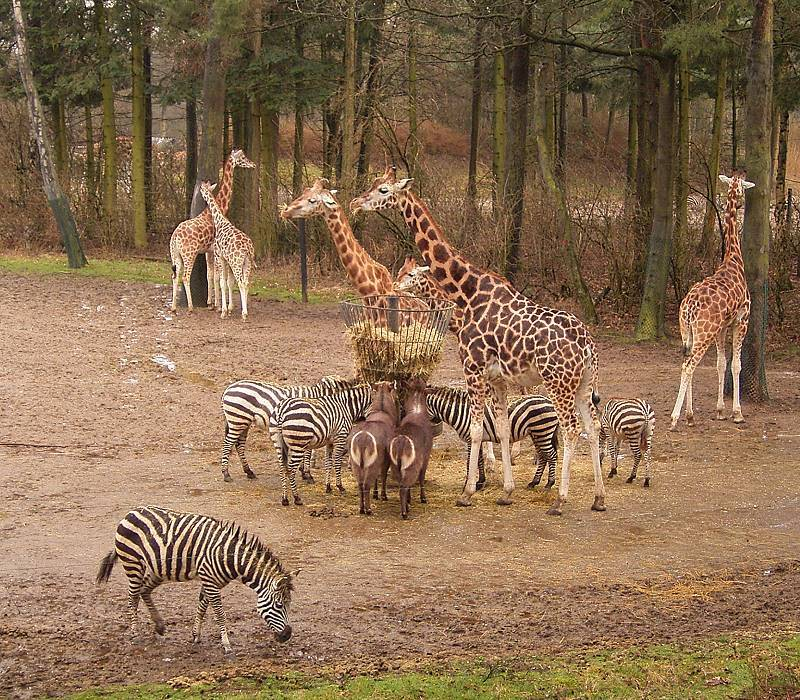
Giraffes, plains zebras and waterbuck in Burgers' Safari

The zoo has eight themed sites called ecodisplays (ecological display):

- Burgers' Safari – Formerly a safari park and is now a large plain only for the animals.
- Burgers' Bush – A 1.5-hectare (3.7-acre) indoor tropical rainforest.
- Burgers' Mangrove – A mangrove swamp. Since July 2017, it has been a 3,000 square meter mangrove hall.
- Burgers' Desert – A 0.75-hectare (1.9-acre) indoor desert (focusing on the Sonoran Desert).
- Burgers' Ocean – A 8,000,000-litre (2,100,000 US gal) seawater aquarium. Two of the main tanks are the 3,000,000-litre (790,000 US gal) ocean housing sharks and other fish, and the 750,000-litre (200,000 US gal) coral reef housing tropical fish, living corals and other invertebrates.
- Burgers' Rimba – Opened in 2008, this area gives visitors an impression of a Southeast Asian rainforest. Animals on display include Sumatran tigers, Malayan sun bears, binturongs, golden-cheeked gibbons, dusky leaf monkeys, Sri Lankan leopards, golden jackals, banteng, muntjac, hog deer, Eld's deer, siamangs, pig-tailed macaques, reticulated pythons, and Asian water monitors.

== Playgrounds ==
Burgers' Zoo has two larger playgrounds and a smaller one.

The two larger playgrounds are located next to each other and connected through the Park Restaurant.

- Burgers' Avonturenland – The zoo's playground, which opened in 2002.
- Burgers' Kids Jungle – An indoor playground themed around a South-American village, which opened in 2012.

== Conservation ==
Burgers’ Zoo has been successful enough in breeding fish and coral for their own aquarium that they can now help provide animals to other public aquariums. They use an artificial moon to stimulate sexual reproduction of corals in their reef, and also clone some 60 varieties.

Besides presenting many of its animals in simulated habitats in spacious indoor ecosystems, Burgers' Zoo also has facilities for conservation and captive breeding of animals that are endangered and threatened with extinction in the wild. The Socorro dove, for example, was wiped out by introduced mammals on its home island. The species is being bred in Burgers' Zoo for eventual reintroduction into the wild.

Burgers' Zoo supports several nature conservation projects. The projects are small but with a big impact.

- Future For Nature – Burgers' Zoo supports the Future For Nature Foundation. This foundation supports nature projects throughout the world, by awarding three cash prizes of 50,000 euros each year to three young, talented nature conservationists, so that they can continue their important nature conservation work. Every year the Future For Nature Awards are presented in Burgers' Zoo.
- Belize – Burgers' Zoo protects a nature reserve with an area of 355 square kilometers, together with the Swiss animal park Papiliorama in Belize.
- Lucie Burgers Foundation – The Lucie Burgers Foundation encourages and facilitates comparative behavioral research in animals. Their aim is to improve the knowledge about the natural behaviour of animals and about ecology.
