= Pharmacy in China =

Pharmacy in China involves the activities engaged in the preparation, standardization and dispensing of drugs, and its scope includes the cultivation of plants that are used as drugs, the synthesis of chemical compounds of medicinal value, and the analysis of medicinal agents. Pharmacists in China are responsible for the preparation of the dosage forms of drugs, such as tablets, capsules, and sterile solutions for injection. They compound physicians', dentists', and veterinarians' prescriptions for drugs. Pharmacological activities are also closely related to pharmacy in China.

There are two main streams of pharmaceutical practice in China, traditional Chinese medicine (TCM) and modern pharmacy. Hospital and community pharmacies are responsible for the dispensing of medicinals used for both streams of pharmaceutical practice.

Around fifty colleges of pharmacy offer pharmacy education, half of which provide a Western medicine approach and the other half traditional Chinese medicine. Both types of colleges offer a four-year curriculum with options for specialization. Graduate study is also available. Most graduates work in hospital pharmacies. Hospital pharmacies participate in the bulk manufacture of drugs and parenteral fluids. A bulk dispensing system is used by some hospitals; individual patient doses are dispensed in others.

Recently, clinical pharmacy services in China have been developed and training courses begun. Curricula with specialization in clinical pharmacy have also been established by colleges of pharmacy.

It is anticipated that through increased awareness of the potential contribution of pharmacists in China's health-care system, more opportunities for educating pharmacists would be made available to meet the vast need of the country. Development of clinical pharmacy services have also been expected to improve the quality of care provided.

== Ancient history ==
The beginnings of pharmacy in China are ancient (see Chinese alchemy). According to legend, Shennong (about 2000 BCE) who sought out and investigated the medicinal value of several hundred herbs. He reputed to have tested many of them on himself, and to have written the first Pen T-Sao, or native herbal, recording 365 drugs. He is said to have tasted hundreds of herbs to test their medical value.

The most well-known work attributed to Shennong is The Divine Farmer's Herb-Root Classic. This work is considered to be the earliest Chinese pharmacopoeia. It includes 365 medicines derived from minerals, plants, and animals. Shennong is credited with identifying hundreds of medical (and poisonous) herbs by personally testing their properties, which was crucial to the development of traditional Chinese medicine.

Still worshiped by native Chinese drug guilds as their patron god, Shennong conceivably examined many herbs, barks, and roots brought in from the fields, swamps, and woods that are still recognized in Pharmacy today. The "bagua" is a mathematical design symbolizing creation and life. Medicinal plants include podophyllum, rhubarb, ginseng, stramonium, cinnamon bark, and, ma huang, or Ephedra.

== Separation of prescribing from dispensing ==
Unlike the prevailing practice in other, particularly Western countries, the duties of the pharmacist and physician are not entirely separated. Chinese doctors are allowed to dispense drugs themselves and the practice of pharmacy is sometimes integrated with that of the physician, particularly in traditional Chinese medicine. The idea of separating the two professions has been debated as the trend for specialization has increased in the health sciences. Other countries such as South Korea, Japan and Taiwan have successfully separated the jurisidications to legally separate the practice of prescribing from the practice of dispensing. That legislation has also specified that only pharmacists may supply scheduled pharmaceuticals to the public, and that pharmacists cannot form business partnerships with physicians or give them "kickback" payments. Possible reform for this area is being considered by the Chinese regulatory authorities.

== Pharmacist role ==
Since the economic reform period of the 1980s, the development of the Chinese pharmaceutical industry has led to the introduction of new and effective drug substances. It also changed the role of the pharmacist. The scope for extemporaneous compounding of medicines was much diminished and with it the need for the manipulative skills that were previously applied by the pharmacist to the preparation of bougies, cachets, pills, plasters, and liquids. Pharmacists continue, however, to fulfill the prescriber's intentions by providing advice and information; by formulating, storing, and providing correct dosage forms; and by assuring the efficacy and quality of the dispensed or supplied medicinal product.

In the future, pharmacists are expected to become more integral within the health care system. Rather than only dispensing medication and other routine duties, pharmacists are to be involved more in patient care with their particular knowledge and skills.

== Hospital pharmacy ==
Since 1949, health care in China has improved. The number of hospitals has increased. While medicines previously were scarce, China now produces approximately 75 percent of the drugs it needs. China has a long history of traditional medicine; although there are attempts to integrate the concepts of traditional and Western medicine, the practices are still segregated. All hospital pharmacies in China have the responsibilities to guarantee the safe and effective use of drugs within the hospital and to do research. Even though Chinese factories manufacture many pharmaceutical products, the hospital pharmacy must manufacture many more.

Hospitals have established Agreed Prescription programs, whereby drugs are manufactured in large batches, repackaged, and distributed to other hospital pharmacies in the area if needed. Quality is assessed chemically and by modern techniques when equipment is available. Most large hospitals now have automated facilities to manufacture sterile solutions. Each hospital has a medical supply committee that supervises the procurement of medical supplies and the reasonable use of drugs.

A government resolution mandates that every hospital pharmacy do research. A primary focus of their research is the integration of traditional and Western medicine. Concepts of traditional and Western medicine are taught in separate pharmacy schools. Most pharmacy undergraduate programs are four years, but some schools recently changed to five years. Challenges for hospital pharmacists in China have been to develop the theoretical and technological knowledge of pharmacy, and to expand the scientific and technical information system that is necessary to do research.

== Education ==
The course of instruction leading to a Bachelor of Science in pharmacy (BPharm) extends at least four years. The first and frequently the second year of training, embracing general education subjects, are often provided by a school of arts and sciences. Many institutions also offer graduate courses in pharmacy and cognate sciences leading to the degrees of Master of Science and Doctor of Philosophy in pharmacy, pharmacology, or related disciplines. These advanced courses are intended especially for those who are preparing for careers in research, manufacturing, or teaching in the field of pharmacy.

Since the treatment with drugs encompasses a wide field of knowledge in the biological and physical sciences, an understanding of these sciences is included for pharmaceutical training. The basic four-year curriculum in the colleges of pharmacy, for example, embraces physics, chemistry, biology, bacteriology, physiology, pharmacology, and many other specialized courses. As the pharmacist is engaged in a business as well as a profession, special training is provided in merchandising, accounting, computer techniques, and pharmaceutical jurisprudence.

Subjects:

- Clinical pharmacy
- Pharmacy practice
- Pharmaceutical care
- Pharmacy administrative sciences
- Pharmacotherapy
- Pharmacoeconomics
- Pharmacogenetics
- Pharmacogenomics
- Pharmacoepidemiology

=== Development of pharmaceutical education ===
Higher pharmaceutical education in China has been developing rapidly. Since 1978, a series of reforms have been carried out in teaching management and training model. Many changes have been made in the fields of pharmaceutical education, such as characteristic higher education of traditional Chinese pharmacy, the education of newly emerging clinical pharmacy, the trend of combination of traditional Chinese pharmacy with Western pharmacy, the reform of four year university education and postgraduate education.

=== Higher education of traditional Chinese pharmacy ===
Traditional Chinese pharmacy has had a history of thousands of years. The scientific therapeutic effects of traditional Chinese materia medica have attracted great attention both at home and abroad. In the recent 20–30 years there has appeared a tendency to "return to nature" owing to the toxic and side effects of chemical medicines and the drug-induced diseases caused by them. On the other hand, the traditional Chinese medicine and pharmacy have attracted more attention because of the difficulty in searching for and synthesizing new compounds. Only by modernization of traditional Chinese materia medica can its use become global. The modernization of traditional Chinese materia medica means studying the theories and the basic content of traditional Chinese pharmacy applying the knowledge of modern science and technology. The information on Chinese materia medica should be expressed in modern scientific indexes, terms, and include standardized methods of quality measurement and modernized forms of medicines. The task of higher education of traditional Chinese pharmacy is to train high-level personnel to fulfill the modernization of traditional Chinese pharmacy.

There are five specialties of traditional Chinese pharmacy and 38 programs in China. These specialties have training targets, core courses and job orientations. All specialties have two common characteristics in their core courses: (i) the basic theories of traditional Chinese medicine, traditional Chinese pharmacy and preparations of traditional Chinese materia medica; and (ii) attention to teaching basic knowledge of modern science that includes advanced mathematics, computer application, mathematical statistics, physics, physical chemistry and analytical chemistry.

=== Education of emerging Clinical Pharmacy ===
With the development of medicine and pharmacy more domestic and foreign medicines have come into the China's medical market. Among them are a number of new drugs and their new drug forms. These have become a burden for the clinical physicians to grasp the knowledge of their application and study the rational clinical use and safety for their therapeutic effects. They have to depend on pharmacists to solve these problems. This is why the education of clinical pharmacy had begun to attract more attention. In 1987 the National Educational Committee approved the start of the specialty of clinical pharmacy. Since the beginning four classes of the students were enrolled. They were five-year system students. The clinical pharmacists educated in China are engaged in the clinical application of drugs and monitoring their therapeutic effects. The first class of these students in the clinical pharmacy specialty graduated in 1994.

Other pharmaceutical universities and colleges (departments) are also taking steps to establish a specialty of clinical pharmacy, adding correspondence courses, beginning postgraduate classes in clinical pharmacy, and opening short courses for advanced study to help pharmacists working in hospitals who have been engaged in clinical application of drugs for many years. This has promoted the development of clinical pharmacy in China.

=== Combination of traditional and modern pharmacy ===
Two kinds of pharmacy have existed in China since Western medicine and pharmacy spread into China more than one hundred years ago: (i) traditional Chinese pharmacy, and (ii) Western pharmacy. They are two different pharmaceutical systems with different theories and approach to research. The former is based on a comprehensive study which emphasizes entirety, mobility and vagueness, while the latter is based on analytical study which emphasizes microconception, stability and accuracy. Both systems have advantages and both have limitations. It has been thought in China that if these two systems are combined, a new system will be formed towards the improvement of the life science of man.

Since the foundation of the People's Republic of China considerable work has been done by grouping and summarizing previous experiences. The progress made in this field includes:

1. The research of active ingredients of traditional Chinese medicinal herbs.

The chemical structures of the active ingredients of hundreds of herbs have been made clear. Now some of the active ingredients can be synthesized or modified in chemical structure. Not only have new drugs been researched but also the therapeutic mechanism of traditional Chinese medicinal herbs have been clarified, which promotes the combination of traditional Chinese pharmacy with Western pharmacy.

2. The research of the compound preparations of traditional Chinese medicinal herbs.

The compound preparations of traditional Chinese medicinal herbs are the most popular recipes used by doctors of traditional Chinese medicine. There are 12,000 recipes in Ben Cao Gangmu (the "Compendium of Materia Medica"). The composition of these recipes has a characteristic regularity and makes the ingredients in every recipe effective as a whole. This corresponds not only to symptoms but also the syndromes of the whole body. The modern study of the compound preparations of traditional Chinese materia medica is an important content of the modernization of traditional Chinese medicine and one of the prerequisites of the combination of traditional Chinese pharmacy with Western pharmacy. The selection of the ingredients and forms of preparations, production procedures (including the form modification), quality control, clinical and pharmacological experiments have been studied systematically. A number of new drugs and their new forms and giving scientific explanation to the regularity in recipe composition have been developed. Some diseases, whose scientific indexes have been known in their treatment by Western medicine, have been treated and reportedly cured by using traditional Chinese medicine. The therapeutic effects of the compound preparations of some traditional Chinese materia medica can be compared clinically with those of Western medicines and are expressed in modern scientific indexes. This provides the material foundation of the compound preparations of traditional Chinese materia medica and the modernization of the expression of their therapeutic activities.

There have been continuing efforts to combine traditional Chinese pharmacy with Western pharmacy. In order to train the personnel who are able to engage in the combination of traditional Chinese pharmacy and Western pharmacy, educational opportunities have been developed to teach and research the traditional Chinese pharmacy and Western pharmacy in combination. The students are trained to have a foundation and experimental skills in both traditional Chinese pharmacy and Western pharmacy (including the knowledge and skills of clinical medicine). There are two approaches for this training: (i) a six-year system of the specialty of combining traditional Chinese pharmacy and Western pharmacy granting master's degree; and (ii) a two-year system of the postbaccalaureate degree class offering bachelor's degree pharmaceutical graduates another bachelor's degree in traditional Chinese pharmacy.

=== 4-year undergraduate education ===
During the first years of the foundation of the People's Republic of China, the courses and the management model of the semester system were introduced from the Soviet Union. This met the needs of the planned economy for China at that time. This model emphasized the dependence of administrative measures planned by the State, e.g., the enrollment and assignment of students, the arrangement of courses. Such a highly centralized and unified way of job could not stimulate the vigor and vitality of universities in running schools. Since 1978 there have been rapid and profound changes in China which have produced differences between the previous educational model and the pace of the reform of the economic system. These are as follows:

Because of the launching of the socialist market economy the students with narrow specific knowledge trained by the semester system could not meet the demands of the personnel with broad specific knowledge needed by the market economy. Further, the number of the university students in China has been insufficient to meet the pharmacy manpower needs. Some areas and units refuse to employ graduates assigned by the Chinese government because the specialties of these graduates do not meet their specific requirements. The employing units need the students who are expert in their specialty and have good adaptability to various jobs. Students are encouraged to elect more optional courses and to learn what is needed by the employer market on their own initiative.

Challenges with developing complex technology for pharmaceutical purposes caused cross-disciplinary sciences to appear as a main focus in the industry. As a result, the undergraduate curriculum has become more comprehensive. However, the number of hours available to courses outside of pharmaceutical subjects was limited. This led to the addition of new required subjects to the curriculum, making it difficult to increase the elective subjects with new content.

The credit system has solved some of the problems in the semester system. The foundation has been emphasized and specialty de-emphasized, as follows:

1. Students who major in different fields of pharmacy have taken common basic courses such as mathematics, chemistry, biology and computer sciences. This has given a foundation of basic theories from these courses to all pharmacy students. The curricula based on the credit system is stipulated to include less than 70 percent of required courses and increase the proportion of optional courses which account for 20–30 percent of all the courses offered. This gives the students the freedom to choose what interests them and what they need in their future jobs.

2. According to the different programs the specific subjects were divided into modules. For example, students who learn analysis and the assay of drugs may elect spectroanalysis, pharmaceutical analysis and other courses. The students who learn hospital pharmacy may elect hospital pharmaceutical preparations, clinical pharmacology and other related topics. Students can choose the subjects in the modules according to the requirements of the country's construction. the needs of social development and their individual interest. The bright students have been allowed to choose more subjects and finish the study earlier than those who are academically challenged or those who take part-time study.

By implementing the credit system, Chinese higher pharmaceutical education has aimed to train students with both specialized expertise and broader skills by combining professional and liberal education.

=== Postgraduate education ===
In 1995 there were 113 MSc programs and 48 PhD programs. The pharmaceutical specialties had 136 professors who served as advisors of doctoral candidates. The number of the students enrolled in 1995 to pursue the master's degree increased by 70 percent and the students pursuing the PhD were 277.5 percent more than in 1990. In order to face the economic development in China, some measures have been taken to improve the postgraduate education. For example, the employers, such as hospitals, factories, research institutions, companies and others who need professional personnel can designate the employees with practical experience to be trained in universities. These employees will return to their employment after graduation. The professors in the universities combine with the researchers to instruct these students. The subject of their thesis is usually related to their job. The employers provide laboratories and facilities as well as some of the tuition. This is an approach to train personnel, which benefits universities, employers and students.

In order to promote scientific research and the training of highly qualified researchers, mobile research stations have been approved by the government. Thus far in China, there have been six such stations where postdoctoral students are carrying on their research in five pharmaceutical specialties. These stations play an important role in stimulating academic exchange, training high-level professional personnel and attracting the overseas-trained students to come back.

Although the postgraduate education of pharmaceutical sciences has developed quickly, the number of the postgraduates is still limited. The proportion of postgraduates to undergraduates is 0.05:1. Many fields, such as pharmaceutical research, pharmaceutical industry and commerce, inspection and clinical application of drugs, pharmaceutical education and management, need graduates with advanced degrees, but these specialties have produced relatively few graduates for several years.

New training approaches have been tried, such as establishing a six-year-system for the higher pharmaceutical education, enrolling middle-school graduates and granting them a Master-Degree after graduation. The characteristics of this system are as follows: (i) it shortens the length of study period (less than one year); (ii) continuous study avoids the repetition of some courses, strengthens the foundation and broadens the knowledge range; (iii) this basic training approach is course/subject oriented, so that the advantages of the skills of teachers and the academic departments are fully taken; and (iv) in the first 4.5–5 years the students finish the courses of under-/post-grad study, then write their thesis under the direction of advisors in the following 1-1.5 years.

== Pharmacy schools and programs ==
The pharmacy schools in China are experiencing the dramatic changes, together with the booming economy and continuous education reform. In the last ten years, one major structural change in the higher educational system was the merger of several medical and pharmacy schools with several major universities. The environment for these pharmacy schools have been changing dramatically from independent or medical university settings into being affiliated to comprehensive and multidisciplinary universities. It presented the similar situation as those happened in the US during last century, when some state universities expanded into pharmacy education or merged with independent pharmacy schools.

There are 51 pharmaceutical institutions of higher learning (including universities and colleges) in China according to the statistics made by the end of 1995. Within these 51 institutions there are 95 programs which have enrolled 3,968 state-planned undergraduate students. In 1995 more students were enrolled in some specialties than in 1990 because of the rapid development of the health and medical economies in China which need more personnel in the fields of pharmacy. The number of the students studying various specialties increased greatly, e.g., pharmaceutical analysis by 64.5 percent, microbial pharmacy by 122 percent, pharmacology of traditional Chinese pharmacy by 200 percent, management of medical and pharmaceutical enterprises by 300 percent and pharmaceutics of traditional Chinese materia medica by 64.2 percent.

=== List ===
- Reference (Chin.)

Anhui:

- Anhui Medical University
- Bengbu School of Medicine
- Southern Anhui Medical College

Beijing:

- Peking University, Peking University Health Science Center - School of Pharmaceutical Sciences
- Capital Medical University (CMU)

Chongqing:

- Chongqing University
- Southwest Agricultural University
- Chongqing Medical University

Fujian:

- Putian Institute
- Xiamen University
- Fujian Medical University

Guangxi:

- Guangxi Medical University
- Guilin Medical College - Department of Pharmacy

Guangdong:

- Sun Yat-sen University
- Jinan University
- Guangdong Medical College
- Guangzhou Medical College
- Guangdong College of Pharmacy - Department of Pharmacy
- Jiaying College

Guizhou:

- Guiyang Medical College - Department of Pharmacy

Gansu:

- Lanzhou University
- Lanzhou Medical College - Department of Pharmacy

Hebei:

- Hebei University
- Hebei Medical University
- Hebei University of Science and Technology
- North China Coal Medical College
- Hebei North University
- Hebei Medical College - Department of Pharmacy

Henan:

- Zhengzhou University
- Henan University
- Xinxiang Medical College
- Yellow River Technical College
- Kaifeng Medical Specific School - Department of Pharmacy

Heilongjiang:

- Harbin Medical University
- Northeast Agricultural University
- Jiamusi University
- Harbin University of Commerce
- Mudanjiang Medical College
- Qiqihar Medical School
- Jiamusi Medical College - Department of Pharmacy

Hong Kong:

- Chinese University of Hong Kong - School of Pharmacy
- School of Chinese Medicine at Hong Kong Baptist University
- Li Ka Shing Faculty of Medicine, The University of Hong Kong

Hubei:

- Huazhong University of Science and Technology
- Wuhan University - College of Pharmacy
- Wuhan University of Science and Technology
- Zhongnan University of Nationalities
- Hebei Medical College - Department of Pharmacy
- Xianning College
- Yunyang School of Medicine
- Tongji Medical University - School of Pharmaceutical Sciences

Hunan:

- Central South University
- Xiangtan University
- Hunan Agricultural University
- South China University
- Central South Forestry University
- Hunan Medical Specific School - Department of Pharmacy

Jiangsu:

- Soochow University
- Jiangsu University
- China Pharmaceutical University (Nanjing)
- Nanjing Medical University
- Xuzhou Medical College
- Naval Medical Specific School - Department of Pharmacy

Jiangxi:

- Nanchang University
- Jiangxi Medical College
- Yichun College
- Jiangxi Science and Technology Teachers College
- Jinggangshan College
- Southern Jiangxi Medical College

Jilin:

- Changchun Institute of Oriental career
- Jilin University
- University of North
- Yanbian University
- Yanbian Medical College (Yanji) - Department of Pharmacy

Liaoning:

- China Medical University
- Shenyang Pharmaceutical University
- Dalian Medical University
- Jinzhou School of Medicine
- Shenyang College of Pharmacy

Macau:

- Macao Polytechnic University - Faculty of Health Sciences and Sports (pharmacy technician training)

Neimeng:

- Inner Mongolia University of Science and Technology
- Inner Mongolia Medical College - Department of Pharmacy

Ningxia:

- Ningxia Medical College

Qinghai:

- Qinghai University
- Qinghai Institute for Nationalities

Shaanxi:

- Xi'an Jiaotong University
- Xian Medical University - School of Pharmaceutical Sciences

Shanxi:

- Shanxi University
- Shanxi Medical University
- Changzhi School of Medicine
- Shanxi Medical College - Department of Pharmacy

Shandong:

- Shandong University
- Ocean University of China
- Yantai University
- Tai Shan Medical College
- Jining Medical College
- Shandong Medical College - Department of Pharmacy

Shanghai:

- East China University of Science and Technology - School of Pharmacy
- Fudan University
- Shanghai Jiaotong University
- Shanghai Medical University - School of Pharmacy
- Shanghai Second Medical University
- Shanghai Polytechnic University
- Second Military Medical University - Department of Pharmacy

Sichuan:

- Sichuan University
- Sichuan Agricultural University
- Luzhou Medical College
- North Sichuan Medical College
- West China Medical University - School of Pharmaceutical Sciences

Tianjin:

- Tianjin University
- Nankai University
- Tianjin Medical University
- Tianjin University of Technology
- Second Tianjin Medical College - Department of Pharmacy

Xinjiang:

- Shihezi University
- Xinjiang Agricultural University
- Xinjiang Medical University
- Shihezi Medical College - Department of Pharmacy
- Xinjiang Medical College - Department of Pharmacy

Yunnan:

- Kunming Medical College
- Dali College
- Yuxi Teachers College

Zhejiang:

- Zhejiang University
- Zhejiang University of Technology
- Wenzhou Medical College
- Hangzhou Teachers College
- China Institute of Measurement
- Shaoxing College of Arts and Pharmacy
- Zhejiang Medical University - Department of Pharmacy

=== TCM colleges ===
- Anhui Chinese Medicine College
- Beijing College of Traditional Chinese Medicine
- Changchun University of Traditional Chinese Medicine
- Chengdu College of Traditional Chinese Medicine
- Guangxi College of Traditional Chinese Medicine
- Guangzhou College of Traditional Chinese Medicine
- Guiyang College of Traditional Chinese Medicine
- Heilongjiang College of Traditional Chinese Medicine
- Heilongjiang Commerce College
- Henan College of Traditional Chinese Medicine
- School of Chinese Medicine at Hong Kong Baptist University
- Hubei College of Traditional Chinese Medicine
- Hunan University of Traditional Chinese Medicine
- Jiangxi Chinese Medicine College
- Jiangxi College of Traditional Chinese Medicine
- Liaoning College of Traditional Chinese Medicine
- Nanjing University of Traditional Chinese Medicine
- Shandong College of Traditional Chinese Medicine
- Shanghai College of Traditional Chinese Medicine
- Tianjin University of Traditional Chinese Medicine
- Shanxi College of Traditional Chinese Medicine
- Yunnan College of Traditional Chinese Medicine
- Zhejiang College of Traditional Chinese Medicine

== Licensing and regulation ==
To practice pharmacy in China in which a license is required, an applicant must be qualified by graduation from a recognized college of pharmacy, meet specific requirements for experience, and pass an examination conducted by the Chinese Pharmaceutical Association as appointed by the government.

Pharmacy laws generally include the regulations for the practice of pharmacy, the sale of liquids, the dispensing of narcotics, and the labeling and sale of dangerous drugs. The pharmacist sells and dispenses drugs within the provisions of the food and drug laws of the country in which he practices. These laws recognize the national pharmacopoeia (which defines products used in medicine, their purity, dosages, and other pertinent data) as the standard for drugs.

Regulatory bodies with responsibilities related to pharmacy are:

- General Administration of Quality Supervision, Inspection and Quarantine
- Ministry of Health
- State Food and Drug Administration
- National Institute for the Control of Pharmaceutical and Biological Products
- Ministry of Agriculture

== Research ==
Pharmaceutical research, in Chinese schools of pharmacy, embraces the organic chemical synthesis of new chemical agents for use as drugs and is also concerned with the isolation and purification of plant constituents that might be useful as drugs. Research in pharmacy also includes formulation of dosage forms of medicaments and study of their stability, methods of assay, and standardization.

Another facet of pharmaceutical research that has attracted wide medical attention is the "availability" to the body (bioavailability) of various dosage forms of drugs. Exact methods of determining levels of drugs in blood and organs have revealed that slight changes in the mode of manufacture or the incorporation of a small amount of inert ingredient in a tablet may diminish or completely prevent its absorption from the gastrointestinal tract, thus nullifying the action of the drug. Ingenious methods have been devised to test the bioavailability of dosage forms. Although such in vitro, or test-tube, methods are useful and indicative, the ultimate test of bioavailability is the patient's response to the dosage form of the drug.

Licensing systems for new medicinal products in China demand increasingly extensive and costly investigation and testing in the laboratory and in clinical trials to establish the efficacy and safety of new products in relation to the claims to be made for their use. Proprietary rights for innovation by the grant of patents and by the registration of trademarks have become increasingly important in the growth of the domestic pharmaceutical industry and its development internationally.

=== Journals ===
- Catalog Periodical List "Pharmaceutics" - Wangfang Data

The results of research in pharmacy are usually published in such journals as the:

- Acta Pharmaceutica Sinica
- Adverse Drug Reaction Journal
- China Journal of Traditional Chinese Medicine and Pharmacy
- China Pharmaceutical Journal
- China Pharmacist
- China Pharmacy
- Chinese Journal of Antibiotics
- Chinese Journal of Clinical Pharmacy
- Chinese Journal of Drug Application and Monitoring
- Chinese Journal of Hospital Pharmacy
- Chinese Journal of Modern Applied Pharmacy
- Chinese Journal of Natural Medicines
- Chinese Journal of New Drugs
- Chinese Journal of New Drugs and Clinical Remedies
- Chinese Journal of Pharmaceutical Analysis
- Chinese Journal of Pharmaceuticals
- Chinese Journal of Pharmacoepidemiology
- Chinese Pharmaceutical Journal
- Chinese Traditional and Herbal Drugs
- Herald of Medicine
- Journal of Beijing University of Traditional Chinese Medicine
- Journal of China Pharmacy (monthly; currently reaches 12,000 hospital pharmacies, being read by some 200,000 pharmacists nationwide.)
- Journal of China Pharmaceutical University
- Journal of Chinese Materia Medica
- Journal of Traditional Chinese Medicine
- Pharmaceutical Care and Research
- Pharmaceutical Education
- Asian Journal of Social Pharmacy

Asian Journal of Pharmaceutical Sciences was founded jointly by Shenyang Pharmaceutical University and China Medicine Technical International Development Association. The journal is published 6 issues per year by Hong Kong Asiamed Publishing House in English for international distribution. There is no page charge, but cost of translation and English may be levied when necessary.

Retail pharmacy

- China Drug Store industry magazine ilib.cn

== Organizations ==
There are numerous pharmacy-related organizations. The Chinese Pharmaceutical Association (CPA) is the national organization of pharmacists and pharmaceutical scientists with the mission to represent and serve pharmacy and pharmaceutical sciences development in China. CPA was founded in 1907, it now has nearly 3000 senior individual members and 35 group members. Through its group members, CPA connects, represents and serves more than 105,000 pharmacists and pharmaceutical scientists around the country. The CPA is a member of the International Pharmaceutial Federation.

There are also other societies in which history, teaching, and the military aspects of pharmacy are given special emphasis.

== Retail (community) pharmacy ==
About 120,000 retail pharmacies operate in China. Most of them are quite small—less than 200 m^{2}—but a few are as large as 1,000 m^{2} or more. The majority are licensed to carry medicines (prescription and over-the-counter [OTC]), traditional Chinese medicines, health foods (designated by the jian shi characters at the beginning of the registration certificate), and family planning products. Some retail pharmacies are also licensed to carry cosmetic products. It is relatively simple to add products the Chinese government classifies as cosmetics to a pharmacy's operating license. Chinese retail pharmacies do not carry products frequently found in US pharmacies, such as shampoo, diapers, nail polish, and batteries. China's pharmacies, however, sell products such as imported skin creams, specialty hair-care products (such as dyes or masks), and feminine-hygiene products.

All retail pharmacies prior to January 2003 -– when WTO rules took effect – had by law must have been government-owned. Many of the state-owned pharmacy companies had consolidated to establish chains or franchises, and many more have contracted day-to-day management to an entrepreneur who pays a small percentage of the profits to its hands-off government owner. In Beijing and Shanghai, the local governments stopped approving applications for new pharmacies about three years ago, but is allowing chain stores to increase their number of outlets. Therefore, any "new" retail pharmacy in these markets must be affiliated with an existing outlet. In Shanghai, pharmacies must also contend with a rule that prohibits chains from opening outlets within a certain distance of existing pharmacies.

Local administrations for industry and commerce and local health bureaus oversee and regulate the pharmacies. Their monitoring of retail outlets includes spot checks of the types of products being sold, follow-ups on consumer complaints, and verification that retail prices match registered prices. Government monitors also verify that products comply with government regulations on labeling and other matters, and that merchandising and advertising materials are compliant and registered.

Chinese pharmacies have been undergoing dramatic changes as the retail medicine market opens up. Under planned reforms, China's retail pharmacies will begin selling a much higher volume of prescription drugs, and hospital pharmacies will eventually be restricted to dispensing prescriptions for inpatient use. Retail pharmacies' businesses will consist more and more of high-volume prescription drug sales and high-margin healthcare and personal-care products, including OTC drugs, health foods, family planning products, and beauty products, similar to a European or North American drugstore model.

More and more patients have been willing to buy non-prescription medicines in convenient drugstores instead of registering and queuing in hospitals. Large numbers of drug wholesalers have also entered the retail market due to the expected returns. Domestic pharmaceutical giant Sanjiu Enterprise Group has planned to open 8,000 to 10,000 outlets at a cost of 1.3 billion yuan (US$157 million).

China Nepstar is the largest retail drugstore chain in China, based on the number of directly operated stores. As of September 2007, the company had 1,791 stores in 62 cities. Nepstar has also planned to establish 5,000 to 10,000 chain stores in the next five years. It provides pharmacy services as well as a wide variety of other merchandise, including over-the-counter drugs, herbal products, personal care products and nutritional supplements. The company also offers 1,108 private-label products under its own brand name. For the six months ended June 30, China Nepstar reported earnings of $4.6 million, after paying preferred dividends, on sales of $124.3 million.

As of 2003, China had 196 pharmaceutical enterprises with chain stores, reporting an annual sales volume of nearly 8 billion yuan (US$967 million). Most chain drugstores though are small in scale. Peace Pharmacy, one of China's largest drug store in Chongqing had only 300 chain stores. Besides medicines, medical equipment are also sold in Chinese drugstores. This has been to meet the demand of consumers who have begun to favor products for self-diagnosis and self-health care.

Rapid mergers and acquisitions, expansion in the retail industry is expected to gradually consolidate the sector.

Pharmacies, found in all towns, can help with minor injuries and ailments. Larger ones sometimes have a separate counter offering diagnosis and advice. Staff can usually help if the customer describes his or her symptoms. The selection of reliable Asian and Western products available is improving and it is possible to self-treat with herbal medicines. Contraceptives are widely available, as are antibiotics.

=== List ===
The key players in the drugstore industry in China are :

- PG Pharma, Shanghai
- China Nepstar, Shenzhen-based
- SuperPharm, Israeli company has about 65 stores in China, as of 2007
- Watsons, owned HK-based Hutchison Whampoa
- Shenzhen Accord Pharmacy Co., Ltd.
- Shenzhen Associate Pharmacy Co., Ltd.
- Guangzhou Pharmaceutical Company
- Jianmin Chain Drugstore
- Guangzhou Caizhilin Chain Drugstore
- Liaoning Chengda Co., Ltd.
- Hangzhou Wulin Drugstore Co., Ltd.
- Ningbo Siming Dayaofang Co., Ltd.
- Hunan Laobaixing Big Drugstore Chain Co., Ltd.
- Hunan Zhilin Medicine (Group) Co., Ltd.
- Hubei Ready Medicine Industry Co., Ltd.
- Chongqing Tongjunge Big Drugstore Chain Co., Ltd.
- Shanghai Huashi Pharmacy Co., Ltd.
- Beijing Golden Elephant Pharmacy Chain Co., Ltd.

== Good Pharmacy Practice ==
As a result of the development of society and national economy, the people's health care level and the sense of self-medication are gradually improving. Therefore, the demand for good pharmacy service especially for carrying out pharmaceutical care not only in hospital but also in community pharmacies are increasing.

The China Nonprescription Medicines Association (CNMA) is a guild of pharmaceutical manufacturers and distributors, especially of those manufacturers of non-prescription medicines and community pharmacies. Based on the pharmaceutical care and licensed pharmacists system, the CNMA under the auspices of government and membership units, consulted the "International Good Pharmacy Practice for Developing Countries" and the "Standards for Quality of Pharmacy Services" and GPP documents of other countries available to constitute the Good Pharmacy Practice and Evaluation Standards of GPP especially for community pharmacies.

== Pharmacoeconomics ==
Limited resources, amidst increasing demand for services, are leading to significant change in the implementation of health care in China, especially manifested lately in the pricing and reimbursement of pharmaceuticals.

Pharmaceutical expenditures can exceed 30% of total health expenditures in some poorer areas; so greater scrutiny and control over drugs are evident lately. Pharmacoeconomic research, either used when health providers examine different treatments to make cost-effective decisions, or when regulatory institutions estimate the greater value of a new product to set a reimbursement level, marks the horizon for the world's pharmaceutical markets.

Pharmacoeconomics as a science has begun to advance with methodological guidelines as it is increasingly applied in many countries.

China today must confront significant cost-containment in health care, as seen in every developing nation of the world. Pharmacoeconomic research thus will likely find favor to facilitate the evaluation of resource utilization for greater efficiency and better health outcomes in its population; however, pharmacoeconomics currently is stagnating in China due to the lack of adequate academic research centers, pharmaceutical industry investment, and government coordination.

It is predicted that China will, out of necessity, end this lag as its health care system overcomes its limitation on pharmacoeconomic knowledge and lessens influences from the old pharmaceutical pricing and reimbursement system. The upsurge import of more Western drugs now with the World Trade Organization (WTO) entry is another force leading to China's eventual progress in this area.

Current applications within a few industrialized countries can serve as a prelude to describing lessons for and reforms taking place in China. There are encouraging, although not yet significant, steps being taken to embed more pharmacoeconomics into the Chinese health care system.

=== Research institutions ===
The China Center for Pharmacoeconomics and Outcomes Research (CCPOR) is a newly established research institution based in the Department of Health Economics and Management at the Peking University Guanghua School of Management.

Fudan Center for Pharmacoeconomic Research and Evaluation (CPRE) of Fudan University in Shanghai.

Pharmacoeconomics China or Chinese PharmacoEconomics Guidelines Project - Chinese Medical Doctor Association is the executive center of this project, and the center specializes in Chinese PharmacoEconomics Guidelines to improve the development of PharmacoEconomic assessment and clinical rational drug usage in China

== Counterfeit drugs ==
Figures in China report almost 200,000 persons are said to have died in 2001 as a consequence of having taken counterfeit drugs.

There are major difficulties for patients accessing expensive pharmaceuticals which encourage smuggling and even home manufacture. The state healthcare system does not cover many drugs, and for those that are covered there is a 30% copayment. The approval process is slow and bureaucratic. Only 100 new drugs were approved between 2001 and 2016 by the China Food and Drug Administration. Once approved, drugs have to be included in the National Reimbursement Drug List to qualify for coverage. Prices are much higher than in other Asian countries.

== Online and mail-order pharmacies ==
Online pharmacies were first established in China in 2005. By the end of 2008, only 10 online pharmacies had obtained permission to sell over-the-counter drugs, a figure that had increased to 639 by January, 2017. Online sales increased in line with the number of pharmacies. The China Food and Drug Administration conducted a pilot reform to admit three businesses using their third-party platform to retail drugs online to consumers from 2013 until August 2016, accounting for to some extent difficulty in its regulation.

== International facilities ==
The U.S. Pharmacopeia has an international facility in Shanghai's Zhangjiang Hi-Tech to work with Chinese companies and regulators on meeting international standards and ensuring the safety of pharmaceuticals, dietary supplements and ingredients. It opened in 2006 and was inaugurated in 2007. (See: USP-China Quarterly Update)

== Museums ==
- The Museum of Huqingyutang Chinese Pharmacy

== See also ==
- Chinese Pharmaceutical Association
- Campaign for Access to Essential Medicines
- Collaborating Centre on International Drug Monitoring in Uppsala
- Department of Essential Drugs and Medicines
- Evidence-based pharmacy in developing countries
- Essential medicines
- Good pharmacy practice
- India's National Institute of Pharmaceutical Education & Research
- List of pharmacy associations
- List of World Health Organization Essential Medicines
- Pharmaceutical industry in China
- State Food and Drug Administration
- Public health in China
- Pharmaceutical policy, national pharmaceuticals policy
- Pharmacies of Norway, for a country comparison
- Pharmacy Council of India
- National Formulary
- Universities Allied for Essential Medicines
