= Evidence-based pharmacy in developing countries =

Many developing nations have developed national drug policies, a concept that has been actively promoted by the WHO. For example, the national drug policy for Indonesia drawn up in 1983 had the following objectives:

- To ensure the availability of drugs according to the needs of the population.
- To improve the distribution of drugs in order to make them accessible to the whole population.
- To ensure efficacy, safety quality and validity of marketed drugs and to promote proper, rational and efficient use.
- To protect the public from misuse and abuse.
- To develop the national pharmaceutical potential towards the achievements of self-reliance in drugs and in support of national economic growth.

To achieve these objectives in Indonesia, the following changes were implemented:

- A national list of essential drugs was established and implemented in all public sector institutions. The list is revised periodically.
- A ministerial decree in 1989 required that drugs in public sector institutions be prescribed generically and that Pharmacy and Therapeutics committees be established in all hospitals.
- District hospitals and health centers have to procure their drugs based on the essential drugs list.
- Most drugs are supplied by three government-owned companies.
- Training modules have been developed for drug management and rational drug use and these have been rolled out to relevant personnel.
- The central drug laboratory and provincial quality control laboratories have been strengthened.
- A major teaching hospital has developed a program on rational drug use, developing a hospital formulary, guidelines for rational diagnosis and treatment guidelines for the rational use of antibiotics.
- Generic drugs have been available at affordable costs to low-income groups.

== Encouraging rational prescribing ==
One of the first challenges is to promote and develop rational prescribing, and a number of international initiatives exist in this area. WHO has actively promoted rational drug use as one of the major elements in its Drug Action Programme. In its publication A Guide to Good Prescribing the process is outlined as:

- define the patient's problem
- specify the therapeutic objectives
- verify whether your personal treatment choice is suitable for this patient
- start the treatment
- give information, instructions and warnings
- monitor (stop) the treatment.

The emphasis is on developing a logical approach, and it allows for clinicians to develop personal choices in medicines (a personal formulary) which they may use regularly. The program seeks to promote appraisal of evidence in terms of proven efficacy and safety from controlled clinical trial data, and adequate consideration of quality, cost and choice of competitor drugs by choosing the item that has been most thoroughly investigated, has favorable pharmacokinetic properties and is reliably produced locally. The avoidance of combination drugs is also encouraged.

The routine and irrational use of injections should also be challenged. One study undertaken in Indonesia found that nearly 50% of infants and children and 75% of the patients aged five years or over visiting government health centers received one or more injections. The highest use of injections was for skin disorders, musculoskeletal problems and nutritional deficiencies. Injections, as well as being used inappropriately, are often administered by untrained personnel; these include drug sellers who have no understanding of clean or aseptic techniques.

Another group active in this area is the International Network for the Rational Use of Drugs (INRUD). This organization, established in 1989, exists to promote rational drug use in developing countries. As well as producing training programs and publications, the group is undertaking research in a number of member countries, focused primarily on changing behavior to improve drug use. One of the most useful publications from this group is entitled Managing Drug Supply. It covers most of the drug supply processes and is built up from research and experience in many developing countries. There a number of case studies described, many of which have general application for pharmacists working in developing countries.

In all the talk of rational drug use, the impact of the pharmaceutical industry cannot be ignored, with its many incentive schemes for doctors and pharmacy staff who dispense, advise or encourage use of particular products. These issues have been highlighted in a study of pharmaceutical sales representative (medreps) in Mumbai. This was an observational study of medreps' interactions with pharmacies, covering a range of neighborhoods containing a wide mix of social classes. It is estimated that there are approximately 5000 medreps in Mumbai, roughly one for every four doctors in the city. Their salaries vary according to the employing organization, with the multinationals paying the highest salaries. The majority work to performance-related incentives. One medrep stated "There are a lot of companies, a lot of competition, a lot of pressure to sell, sell! Medicine in India is all about incentives to doctors to buy your medicines, incentives for us to sell more medicines. Even the patient wants an incentive to buy from this shop or that shop. Everywhere there is a scheme, that's business, that's medicine in India.'

The whole system is geared to winning over confidence and getting results in terms of sales; this is often achieved by means of gifts or invitations to symposia to persuade doctors to prescribe. With the launch of new and expensive antibiotics worldwide, the pressure to sell with little regard to the national essential drug lists or rational prescribing. One medrep noted that this was not a business for those overly concerned with morality. Such a statement is a sad reflection on parts of the pharmaceutical industry, which has an important role to play in the development of the health of a nation. It seems likely that short-term gains are made at the expense of increasing problems such as antibiotic resistance. The only alternatives are to ensure practitioners have the skills to appraise medicine promotion activities or to more stringently control pharmaceutical promotional activities.

== Rational dispensing ==
In situations where medicines are dispensed in small, twisted-up pieces of brown paper, the need for patient instruction takes on a whole new dimension. Medicines should be issued in appropriate containers and labelled. While the patient may be unable to read, the healthcare worker is probably literate. There are many tried-and-tested methods in the literature for using pictures and diagrams to aid patient compliance. Symbols such as a rising or setting sun to depict time of day have been used, particularly for treatments where regular medication is important, such as cases of tuberculosis or leprosy.

Poverty may force patients to purchase one day's supply of medicines at a time, so it is important to ensure that antibiotics are used rationally and not just for one or two days' treatment. Often, poor patients need help from pharmacists to understand which are the most important medicines and to identify the items, typically vitamins, that can be missed to reduce the cost of the prescription to a more manageable level.

== The essential drugs concept ==
The essential drugs list concept was developed from a report to the 28th World Health Assembly in 1975 as a scheme to extend the range of necessary drugs to populations who had poor access because of the existing supply structure. The plan was to develop essential drugs lists based on the local health needs of each country and to periodically update these with the advice of experts in public health, medicine, pharmacology, pharmacy and drug management. Resolution number 28.66 at the Assembly requested the WHO Director-General to implement the proposal, which led subsequently to an initial model list of essential drugs (WHO Technical Series no 615, 1977). This model list has undergone regular review at approximately two-yearly intervals and the current 14th list was published in March 2005. The model list is perceived by the WHO to be an indication of a common core of medicines to cover most common needs. There is a strong emphasis on the need for national policy decisions and local ownership and implementation. In addition, a number of guiding principles for essential drug programs have emerged.

- The initial essential drugs list should be seen as a starting point.
- Generic names should be used where possible, with a cross-index to proprietary names.
- Concise and accurate drug information should accompany the list.
- Quality, including drug content stability and bioavailability, should be regularly assessed for essential drug supplies.
- Decisions should be made about the level of expertise required for drugs. Some countries make all the drugs on the list available to teaching hospitals and have smaller lists for district hospitals and a very short list for health centers.
- Success depends on the efficient supply, storage and distribution at every point.
- Research is sometimes required to settle the choice of a particular product in the local situation.

=== The model list of essential drugs ===
The model list of essential drugs is divided into 27 main sections, which are listed in English in alphabetical order. Recommendations are for drugs and presentations. For example, paracetamol appears as tablets in strengths of 100 mg to 500 mg, suppositories 100 mg and syrup 125 mg/5ml. Certain drugs are marked with an asterisk (previously a ៛), which denotes an example of a therapeutic group, and other drugs in the same group could serve as alternatives.

The lists are drawn up by consensus and generally are sensible choices. There are ongoing initiatives to define the evidence that supports the list. This demonstrates the areas where RCTs (randomized controlled trials) or systematic reviews exist and serves to highlight areas either where further research is needed or where similar drugs may exist which have better supporting evidence.

In addition to work to strengthen the evidence base, there is a proposal to encourage the development of Cochrane reviews for drugs that do not have systematic review evidence.

Application of NNTs (numbers needed to treat) to the underpinning evidence should further strengthen the lists. At present, there is an assumption among doctors in some parts of the world that the essential drugs list is really for the poor of society and is somehow inferior. The use of NNTs around analgesics in the list goes some way to disprove this and these developments may increase the importance of essential drugs lists.

== Communicating clear messages ==
The impact of pharmaceutical representatives and the power of this approach has led to the concept of academic detailing to provide clear messages. A study by Thaver and Harpham described the work of 25 private practitioners in area around Karachi. The work was based on assessment of prescribing practices, and for each practitioner included 30 prescriptions for acute respiratory infections (ARIs) or diarrhea in children under 12 years of age. A total of 736 prescriptions were analysed and it was found that an average of four drugs were either prescribed or dispensed for each consultation. An antibiotic was prescribed in 66% of prescriptions, and 14% of prescriptions were for an injection. Antibiotics were requested for 81% of diarrhea cases and 62% of ARI cases. Of the 177 prescriptions for diarrhea, only 29% were for oral rehydration solution. The researchers went on to convert this information into clear messages for academic dealing back to the doctors. The researchers went on to implement the program and assessed the benefits. This was a good piece of work based on developing messages that are supported by evidence.

== Drug donations ==
It is a natural human reaction to want to help in whatever way possible when face with human disaster, either as a result of some catastrophe or because of extreme poverty. Sympathetic individuals want to take action to help in a situation in which they would otherwise be helpless, and workers in difficult circumstances, only too aware of waste and excess at home, want to make use of otherwise worthless materials. The problem is that these situations do not lend themselves to objectivity. There are numerous accounts of tons of useless drugs being air-freighted into disaster areas. It the requires huge resources to sort out these charitable acts and often the drugs cannot be identified because the labels are not in a familiar language. In many cases, huge quantities have to be destroyed simply because the drugs are out of date, spoiled, unidentifiable, or totally irrelevant to local needs. Generally, had the cost of shipping been donated instead, then many more people would have benefited.

In response to this, the WHO has generated guidelines for drug donations from a consensus of major international agencies involved in emergency relief. If these are followed, a significant improvement in terms of patient benefit and use of human resources will result.

=== WHO guidelines for drug donations 2005 ===
==== Selection of drugs ====
- Drugs should be based on expressed need, be relevant to disease pattern and be agreed with the recipient.
- Medicines should be listed on the country's essential drugs list or WHO model list.
- Formulations and presentations should be similar to those used in the recipient country.

==== Quality assurance (QA) and shelf life ====
- Drugs should be from a reliable source and WHO certification for quality of pharmaceuticals should be used.
- No returned drugs from patients should be used.
- All drugs should have a shelf life of at least 12 months after arrival in the recipient country.

==== Presentation, packing and labelling ====
- All drugs must be labelled in a language that is easily understood in the recipient country and contain details of generic name, batch number, dosage form, strength, quantity, name of manufacturer, storage conditions and expiry date.
- Drugs should be presented in reasonable pack sizes (e.g. no sample or patient starter packs).
- Material should be sent according to international shipping regulations with detailed packing lists. Any storage conditions must be clearly stated on the containers, which should not weigh more than 50 kg. Drugs should not be mixed with other supplies.

==== Information and management ====
- Recipients should be informed of all drug donations that are being considered or under way.
- Declared value should be based on the wholesale price in the recipient country or on the wholesale world market price.
- Cost of international and local transport, warehousing, etc., should be paid by the donor agency unless otherwise agreed with the recipient in advance.

== Evidence-based pharmacy practice ==
While modern practices, including the development of clinical pharmacy, are important, many basic issues await significant change in developing countries.

- Medicines can often be found stored together in pharmacological groups rather than in alphabetical order by type.
- Refrigerator space is often inadequate and refrigerators unreliable.
- There are different challenges, such as ensuring that termites do not consume the outer packages and labels or that storage is free of other vermin such as rats.
- Dispensary packaging and labelling can be woefully inadequate and patients leave with little or no understanding of how to take medicines which may have cost them at least one week's earnings.
- Medicines are often out of stock, not just for a few hours but for days or even weeks, particularly at the end of the financial year.
- Protocols and standard operating procedures are rarely found.
- Even when graduate pharmacists are employed, they often have little opportunity to perform above the level of salesperson, simply issuing medicines and collecting payment. For example, several hospital pharmacies in Mumbai, India, are open 24 hours per day for 365 days per year but only to function as retail outlets selling medicines to outpatients or to relatives of inpatients who then hand over the medicines to the nursing staff for administration.

== Conclusions ==
Evidence is as important in the developing world as it is in the developed world. Poverty comes in many forms. While the most noticed are famine and poor housing, both potent killers, medical and knowledge poverty are also significant. Evidence-based practice is one of the ways in which these problems can be minimized. Potentially, one of the greatest benefits of the internet is the possibility of ending knowledge poverty and in turn influencing the factors that undermine wellbeing. Essential drugs programs have been a major step in ensuring that the maximum number benefit from effective drug therapy for disease.

== See also ==
- Essential medicines
- WHO Model List of Essential Medicines
- Department of Essential Drugs and Medicines
- Campaign for Access to Essential Medicines
- Evidence-based practice
- Universities Allied for Essential Medicines

== Useful sources of information ==
The following is a list of useful publications from the WHO Department of Essential Drugs and Medicines Policy about essential drugs programs.

=== General publications ===
- Essential Drugs Monitor - periodical issued twice a year, covering drug policy, research, rational drug use and recent publications.
- WHO Action Programme on Essential Drugs in the South-East Asia Region - report on an Intercountry Consultative Meeting, New Delhi, 4–8 March 1991. 49 pages, ref no SEA/Drugs/83 Rev.1.

=== National drug policy ===
- Report of the WHO Expert Committee on National Drug Policies - contribution to updating the WHO Guidelines for Developing Drug Policies. Geneva. 19–23 June 1995. 78 pages, ref no WHO/DAP/95.9.
- Guidelines for Developing National Drug Policies - 1988, 52 pages, ISBN 92-4-154230-6.
- Indicators for Monitoring National Drug Policies - P Brudon-Jakobowicz, JD Rainhorn, MR Reich, 1994, 205 pages, order no 1930066.

=== Selection and use ===
- Rational Drug Use: consumer education and information - DA Fresle, 1996, 50 pages, ref no DAP/MAC/(8)96.6.
- Estimating Drug Requirements: a practical manual - 1988, 136 pages, ref no WHO/DAP/88.2.
- The Use of Essential Drugs. Model List of essential drugs - updated every two years. Currently 14th edition, 2005. The list is available at: www.who.int/medicines
- Drugs Used in Sexually Transmitted Diseases and HIV Infection - 1995, 97 pages, ISBN 92-4-140105-2.
- Drugs Used in Parasitic Diseases (2e) - 1995, 146 pages, ISBN 92-4-140104-4.
- Drugs Used in Mycobacterial Diseases - 1991, 40 pages, ISBN 92-4-140103-6.
- Who Model Prescribing Information: Drugs Used in Anaesthesia - 1989, 53 pages, ISBN 978-9-241-40101-2.
- Guidelines for Safe Disposal of Unwanted Pharmaceuticals In and After Emergencies - ref no WHO/EDM/PAR/99.4.

=== Supply and marketing ===
- Guidelines for Drug Donations - interagency guidelines, revised 1999. Ref no WHO/EDM/PAR/99.4.
- Operational Principles for Good Pharmaceutical Procurement - Essential Drugs and Medicines Policy / Interagency Pharmaceutical Coordination Group, Geneva, 1999.
- Managing Drug Supply - Management Sciences for Health in collaboration with WHO, 1997, 832 pages, ISBN 1-56549-047-9.
- Ethical Criteria for Medicinal Drug Promotion - 1988, 16 pages, ISBN 978-9-241-54239-5.

=== Quality assurance ===
- WHO/UNICEF Study on the Stability of Drugs During International Transport - 1991, 68 pages, ref no WHO/DAP/91.1.

=== Human resources and training ===
- The Role of the Pharmacist in the Health Care System - 1994, 48 pages, ref no WHO/PHARM 94.569.
- Guide to Good Prescribing - TPGM de Vries, RH Henning, HV Hogerzeil, DA Fresle, 1994, 108 pages, order no. 1930074. Free to developing countries.
- Developing Pharmacy Practice: a Focus on Patient Care - 2006, 97 pages, World Health Organization (WHO) and International Pharmaceutical Federation (FIP).

=== Research ===
- No 1 Injection Practices Research - 1992, 61 pages, ref no WHO/DAP92.9.
- No 3 Operational Research on the Rational Use of Drugs - PKM Lunde, G Tognoni, G Tomson, 1992, 38 pages, ref no WHO/DAP/92.4.
- No 24 Public Education in Rational Drug Use: a global survey - 1997, 75 pages, ref no WHO/DAP/97.5.
- No 25 Comparative Analysis of National Drug Policies - Second Workshop, Geneva, 10–13 June 1996. 1997, 114 pages, ref no WHO/DAP/97.6.
- No 7 How to Investigate Drug Use in Health Facilities: selected drug use indicators - 1993, 87 pages, order no 1930049.
