= Rachel Kiddell-Monroe =

Health academic, lawyer

Rachel Kiddell-Monroe LL.M
- Born: United Kingdom
- Citizenship: Canadian
- Education: McGill University
- Occupations: Lawyer, humanitarian
- Employer: McGill University
- Organization: See Change Initiative

Rachel Kiddell-Monroe is a Montreal-based academic, activist, and lawyer. She is the General Director of See Change Initiative and faculty at McGill University where she teaches about humanitarian aid.

She has worked globally for Médecins Sans Frontières, including supporting refugees arriving in the Democratic Republic of the Congo fleeing the Rwanda genocide.

== Early life ==
Kiddell-Monroe was born and raised in England. As a student she volunteered with Amnesty International in Indonesia.

She studied law at McGill University.

== Career ==
Kiddell-Monroe has worked for Médecins Sans Frontières in Canada, the Democratic Republic of the Congo, Djibouti, Somalia and Rwanda before being a regional advisor for Latin America. She was based in Goma during the 1994 Rwanda genocide where she worked to support the influx of refugees fleeing violence.

She was the head of the Médecins Sans Frontières's Access to Essential Medicine campaign before being elected to the organization's international board of directors.

She has previously been the President of Universities Allied for Essential Medicines and is a Professor of Practice at McGill University, where she lectures on international development and humanitarian action.

In her 2017 TEDx Talk she called on people to reject fear and embrace solidarity.

In 2018, Kiddell-Monroe launched See Change Initiative a not-for-profit to tackle tuberculosis in Nunavut.

== Academia ==
She has published papers on access to essential medicine, the decolonization of global health, medical innovation, and tuberculosis in Nunavut.

== Awards ==
She won the 2020 Woman of Distinction award for Social and Environmental Engagement from the Women's Y Foundation. She became a lifetime Ashoka Fellow in 2023.
