= T1International =

Global diabetes charity

- Founded: 2014
- Founder: Elizabeth Pfiester
- Executive Director: Shaina Kasper
- Website: www.t1international.com

T1International is a non-profit organization led by people with and impacted by diabetes for people with diabetes fighting for global healthcare equity. They do not accept money from pharmaceutical companies or any other entity that they feel might compromise their independence, integrity, or ability to speak out freely. T1International launched the #insulin4all social media campaign and organized high-profile protests outside Eli Lilly and Company headquarters.

== History ==
T1International was founded by Elizabeth Pfiester in 2014. The group has a focus on the affordability and accessibility of insulin, glucose self-monitoring supplies, and other essential care and medicines for people living with diabetes.

== Activities ==
T1International works globally and launched the social media insulin4all campaign Their second protest outside the headquarters of Eli Lilly and Company in 2019 included a confrontation between company executive and the mother of Alec Smith, who died in 2017, after rationing insulin manufactured by Eli Lilly.

T1International does an Out-of-Pocket Expenses and Rationing survey every other year to determine what people are paying for insulin, glucose self-monitoring supplies, and other essential medicines and supplies around the world.

== See also ==
- Campaign for Access to Essential Medicines
- Universities Allied for Essential Medicines
- Médecins Sans Frontières
