= China Nepstar =

Chinese pharmacy brand chain

China Nepstar Chain Drugstore Ltd.
- Type: private
- Industry: Pharmacy, retail (drugs)
- Founded: 1995
- Headquarters: Nanshan District, Shenzhen
- Key people: Qian Jiannong (CEO)
- Revenue: ▲2.218 billion CNY (2009)
- Net income: ▲140 million CNY (2009)
- Number of employees: 14,793 (March 2009)

China Nepstar Chain Drugstore Ltd.
- Simplified Chinese: 中国海王星辰连锁药店有限公司
- Traditional Chinese: 中國海王星辰連鎖藥店有限公司
Transcriptions
Standard Mandarin
- Hanyu Pinyin: Zhōngguó Hǎi Wángxīngchén Liánsuǒ Yàodiàn Yǒuxiàngōngsī

China Nepstar Chain Drugstore Ltd., which conducts business as China Nepstar (Chinese: 海王星辰; pinyin: Hǎiwángxīng chén), is China's largest retail drugstore chain, based on the number of directly operated stores. It is headquartered in Nanshan District, Shenzhen.

As of April 2016, the company had 1,965 directly operated stores in China, one headquarters distribution center, and 15 regional distribution centers in China.

It uses directly operated stores, centralized procurement, and a network of regional distribution centers to provide customers with pharmacy services and a wide variety of other merchandise, including over-the-counter ("OTC") drugs, nutritional supplements, herbal products, personal care products, family care products, and convenience products including consumables.

The company also offers products under its own brand names (private label products). It offers 1,356 private label products.

The company pioneered the concept of chain retailing in pharmacies in China.

== History ==
- June 1995: Shenzhen Nepstar Medical Co. Ltd. was established
- January 1996: Joined the National Association of Chain Drug Stores (NACDS) as its first Chinese member
- June 1996: Opened the first Nepstar drugstore - Shenzhen Guiyuan Store
- December 1998: Started operations in Kunming, the first outside of Guangdong Province
- March 2002: Named one of the 'Top 100 Chinese Chain Enterprises' for the first time by the China Chain Store & Franchise Association
- June 2002: Signed Master Franchise Contract with The Medicine Shoppe International to introduce the first international pharmaceutical retailing brand into mainland China
- November 2003: Partnered with Beijing Tong Ren Tang (Group) Co. Ltd., established Beijing Tong Ren Tang Commercial Investment and Development Co. Ltd.
- September 2004: Signed direct investment agreement with Goldman Sachs
- September 2007: Number of outlets exceeded 1,700
- November 2007: Listed on the New York Stock Exchange
- January 2008: Terminated voting rights agreement for Yunnan JianZhiJia Chain Drugstore Co. Ltd. (JZJ)

== Corporate affairs ==
It is headquartered in the China Nepstar Building (海王星辰大厦) in Nanshan District.

Its head office was formerly on the 6th floor of Block B of the Xinnengyuan Building (simplified Chinese: 新能源大厦; traditional Chinese: 新能源大廈; pinyin: Xīnnéngyuán Dàshà) in Nanshan District.

== Products ==
China Nepstar's typical store carries approximately 1,800 to 2,350 different products. It offers a range of complementary products in each therapeutic category so that customers have more choices to suit their needs. In addition, its staff recommends a combination of products to enhance the treatment. For products with the same therapeutic purpose, the company offers choices in each of the high, medium and low price ranges to suit the needs of customers with different spending power. In each therapeutic category, it also offers high margin private label products.

=== Prescription Drugs ===
China Nepstar offers approximately 1,199 prescription drugs. The Company accepts prescriptions only from licensed health care providers and does not prescribe medications or otherwise practice medicine. Its in-store pharmacists verify the validity, accuracy and completeness of all prescription drug orders. The Company asks all prescription drug customers to provide it with information regarding drug allergies, existing medical conditions and existing medications. Its in-store pharmacists also perform a drug utilization review, in which they cross-check every prescription against the customer's submitted information for drug, disease and allergy interactions. Sales of prescription drugs accounted for 23.4% of its revenue during the year ended December 31, 2007.

=== Over-the-Counter ===
The company offers approximately 1,182 OTC drugs, including western medicines and traditional Chinese medicines, for the treatment of common diseases. Sales of OTC drugs accounted for 35.6% its revenue in 2007.

=== Nutritional Supplements and Herbal Products ===
China Nepstar offers approximately 636 nutritional supplements, including a variety of healthcare supplements, vitamin, mineral and dietary products. Sales of nutritional supplements accounted for 18.3% of its revenue in 2007. The company offers various types of drinkable herbal remedies and packages of assorted herbs for making soup, which are used by consumers as health supplements. Sales of herbal products accounted for 2.6% of its revenue in 2007.

=== Other Products ===
The company's other products include personal care products, such as skin care, hair care and beauty products, family care products, such as portable medical devices for family use, birth control and early pregnancy test products and convenience products, including soft drinks, packaged snacks, and other consumable, cleaning agents, stationeries. Its other products also include seasonal and promotional items. Sales of other products accounted for 20.1% of China Nepstar's revenue in 2007.

=== Private Label Products ===
China Nepstar's private label portfolio has 1,356 products marketed under 133 private labels, covering all categories of products offered by the Company except herbal products. In 2007, private label products accounted for approximately 18.7% of its revenue. Some of its private labels include Beautiful Life, which the Company introduced in November 2005, to market nutritional supplements related to beauty care; Qianlong, which was introduced in January 2006, to market a variety of OTC drugs, including gastrointestinal and dermatology products, and Wisconsin, which was introduced in November 2006, to market 20 different types of nutritional supplements manufactured in the United States.

== Stores ==
In 2007, China Nepstar substantially increased its market penetration in coastal cities with relatively high household disposable income, where it already had a presence.

These cities include Shenzhen (from 202 stores as of December 31, 2006 to 311 stores as of December 31, 2007), Dalian (from 127 stores to 174 stores), Guangzhou (from 123 stores to 161 stores), Hangzhou (from 102 stores to 144 stores), Ningbo (from 73 stores to 96 stores), Dongguan (from 75 stores to 94 stores), Suzhou (from 54 stores to 70 stores), Tianjin (from 23 stores to 66 stores), and Shanghai (from 46 stores to 60 stores).

China Nepstar Chain Drugstore Limited (NPD.NYSE) plans to open 1,050 new chain stores in 2008 and expects to have more than 3000 outlets with about eight million of registered customers by then, said Qian Jiannong, CEO of China Nepstar Chain Drugstore.

As the largest trans-regional chain drugstore in China, China Nepstar Chain Drugstore opened 210 new stores within the fourth quarter and its total chain store number is likely to top 2,000 by the end of this year, said Qian at the celebration meeting for its listing at New York Stock Exchange.

== Listings ==
China Nepstar Chain Drugstore Ltd. went public on the NYSE on November 9, 2007, through an IPO of 23,718,750 American Depository Shares (including green shoe) offered at a price of US$16.20 per ADS.

China Nepstar Chain Drugstore Limited has said it has no plans to get listed on China's A-share market. As the capital raised from its IPO on New York Stock Exchange (November 9, 2007) is sufficient to finance current expansion activities, there's no additional placement plan for the near future.

== Agreements ==
China Nepstar Chain Drugstore has signed strategic cooperation agreements with 16 domestic and multinational suppliers of pharmaceutical and healthcare products for 2008.

These agreements were signed at an event to celebrate the initial public offering of the company on the New York Stock Exchange attended by representatives from more than 300 manufacturers and wholesalers on December 14, 2007.

The cooperation agreements were entered into with each of Tianjin Smith Kline & French Laboratories Ltd., Bayer Healthcare Company Ltd., Eli Lilly and Company, Boehringer Ingelheim Shanghai Pharmaceuticals Co. Ltd., Wyeth Pharmaceutical Company Ltd., Hunan Taier Pharmaceutical Company Limited, Taiji Group, Shandong DONG-E E-JIAO Co. Ltd., and Kunming Dihon Medical Co., Ltd., as well as seven other suppliers of pharmaceutical and healthcare products. In addition to procuring merchandise from these suppliers, the company will also partner with these suppliers to promote health education among Chinese consumers.

In addition, a number of prominent Chinese and multinational pharmaceutical companies, including Shandong DONG-E E-JIAO Co. Ltd., have agreed to establish exclusive manufacturing lines to manufacture certain products based on Nepstar's specifications and packaging requirements and to sell these products solely through Nepstar's network of drugstores.

== CEO ==
Jiannong Qian has served as a director and chief executive officer of the Company since August 2006. He was the vice general manager of Wumart Stores, Inc. from 2005 to 2006. From 2003 to 2005, he was the vice president of OBI (China) Management System Co., Ltd., a subsidiary of OBI Heimwerkermaerkte AG, a German corporation. From 2002 to 2003, he was the assistant general manager of China Resources Vanguard Co., Ltd. From 1997 to 2001, he worked at Metro AG and his last position at Metro AG was the manager of food purchase department. From 1994 to 1997, he worked as a senior manager at Weixing Company Group. From 1990 to 1994, he was a member and the chairman of general council of the Chinese Economists' Association in Germany. From 1983 to 1987, he was a lecturer of Shanghai University of Finance and Economics. Mr. Qian received a bachelor's degree in economics from Shandong University in 1983, a master's degree in economics from University of Essen in Germany in 1992, and studied in the doctoral program in economics in University of Duisburg-Essen from 1992 to 1994.

== Acquisitions ==
- 2008-2-28: Acquired Ningbo New Century Medical Ltd.'s 68 drugstores for US$4.1 million.
- 2008-3-6: Acquired Dongguan Hui Ren Tang Pharmaceutical Co. Ltd.'s 18 drugstores for US$0.3 million.
- 2008-8-8: Acquired Qingdao Kangjie Chain Drugstore Co. Ltd.'s 42 drugstores for US$2.5 million.

== See also ==
- Pharmacy in China
- Pharmaceutical industry in China
- List of pharmacies
