= Horsten =

Horsten is a surname. Notable people with the surname include:

- Eelco Horsten (born 1989), Dutch soccer player
- Gerrit Horsten (1900–1961), Dutch footballer
- Joos Horsten (1942–2008), Belgian businessman
- Thomas Horsten (born 1994), Dutch soccer player

== See also ==
- Hörsten, German municipality
