= Chinese Pharmaceutical Association =

Chinese regulatory and professional body

The Chinese Pharmaceutical Association is the regulatory and professional body for pharmacists and pharmaceutical scientists in China. It is headquartered in Beijing, and there are also offices nationwide. Founded in 1907, as a national professional pharmaceutical organization, it is one of the earliest and largest academic organizations in China. It is a member of Chinese Association for Science and Technology (CAST), International Pharmaceutical Federation (FIP), and Asian Federation for Medicinal Chemistry (AFMC).

== Members ==
The CPA has around 100,000 individual members, including about 3000 seniors, and 33 group members all over China. It represents pharmacists from hospitals and institutions, and pharmaceutical research and industrial professionals as well as personnel from administration and education, with 13 committees of different specialty and 7 working committees affiliated, 14 academic periodicals and publications sponsored. The routine duties of CPA are carried out by its secretariat.

== Committee ==
The committee of Hospital pharmacy section of CPA organizes conferences, meetings and seminars for pharmacists to exchange professional experiences and to improve the standards and the quality of clinical pharmacy services and pharmaceutical care. It issues guidelines on the management and administration of hospital pharmacy including dispensing, handling of medication and hospital pharmaceutical preparations. The committee also promotes the improvement of quality services, rational use of drugs, and the implementation of pharmaceutical care. Continuing education programs have been initiated by the CPA especially for young pharmacists.

== Conferences and seminars ==
Also, the CPA concentrates on the activities of academic exchange by organizing annual conferences and seminars to promote professional knowledge and academic exchange as well as organizing nationwide Pharmacist and Pharmacy Weeks. The Annual Conference of CPA is held every November with around 850 participants from various pharmaceutical specialties. It is a large, influential conference with a high academic level. In addition, various committees of different specialties organize annual academic meetings for exchanging and promoting professional science and technology areas in each aspect.

== Pharmacist Week ==
Since 1998, to publicize the role of the pharmacist as a team member of the national health care system in providing appropriate drug therapy and drug information, the Center for the Development of Science and Technology of the CPA have organized a nationwide Pharmacist Week every year.

== See also ==
- Pharmacy in China
- Pharmaceutical industry in China
