= China Pharmaceutical Industry Association =

The China Pharmaceutical Industry Association (CPIA) was founded in September 1988 and it is a non-governmental, non-profit pharmaceutical industry association in China. Its members are mainly from large and medium-sized pharmaceutical corporations, pharmaceutical machinery and medicinal glass packaging companies, regional pharmaceutical industrial associations, pharmaceutical research institutions, designing institutes, universities, colleges and secondary schools of this sector etc.

CPIA is a national level society registered in the Ministry of Civil Affairs, with the status of social legal person. The State-owned Assets Supervision and Administration Commission of the State Council directly administer the association. CPIA is a member and also a standing council director's unit of China Federation of Industrial Economics. Besides, CPIA is a member of the Society Research Study under the Ministry of Civil Affairs, and also one of the main founders of Asian Federation for Medicinal Chemistry. Now CPIA has 338 members, the industrial output value of which (added together) is nearly up to 80 percent of that of the whole China's pharmaceutical industry. CPIA also has 15 professional working units: 2 branch associations, 13 working & coordinating committees and communication groups.

== Aims ==
The aims of CPIA are focused on abiding by the Constitution, laws, regulations and policies of P.R.C, undertaking industry management work entrusted by the government, serving as a bridge between the government and enterprises, serving its members & protecting their legal rights & interests, expressing the opinions of the members of the government, assisting the government to make industrial policies, promoting the development of the pharmaceutical industry in China.

CPIA offers service to its members and has completed a number of projects related to industry surveys and research since its establishment. CPIA also played a role as communicator between the government and the members, expressed opinions about industry policies and proposed constructive suggestions to the government. Moreover, CPIA collects technical, economic, marketing, policy related information and materials of the industry from China and abroad and supplied them to its members. CPIA also carries out a wide range consultancy services and initiated technical transfer programs and activities, which give considerable benefits to its members. CPIA has organized workshops, seminars to coordinate direct dialogues between the government and member companies focusing on relevant hot topics of drug bidding policies, drug pricing, national drug list for basic medical insurance, drug registration and drug reimbursement. CPIA has set up a system of conducting regular dialogue with the Price Department of National Development and Reform Commission, the Medical Insurance Department of the Ministry of Human Resources and Social Security, and the Drug Registration Dept. of State Food and Drug Administration. These activities enhanced the understanding between the government and the enterprises and also helped the members of CPIA adequately carry out drug laws, regulations and policies of the government. Entrusted by China Federation of the Industrial Economics, CPIA recommended concerned experts to discuss MOC (Ministry of Commerce)'s List of the Technologies Encouraged to Import, Technologies Restricted to Import, Technologies Forbidden to export.

CPIA explored nongovernmental contacts and exchanges with foreign counterparts, established relationships with pharmaceutical industry associations from Southeast Asia, West Europe, North Europe as well as Taiwan Region, Japan, South Korea, and India.

The CPIA has been supported by its members and appraised by the government. It was honored as "Excellency Rewards for Industrial Association" in the year of 1994, 1998 and 2003. It was also awarded a medal as "SARS Fighters" as an advanced national industrial association by the Ministry of Civil Affairs.

CPIA has always been led by pharmaceutical industry senior executives and entrepreneurs. The management team of CPIA was elected in April 2004 and the sixth session of the leadership is as follows: Chairman, Ms Zheng Hong, the Chairman of China National Pharmaceutical Group Corporation; Executive Chairman, Mr. Li Shunnian, also the 3rd, 4th and 5th Chairman of CPIA; Honorary Chairman, Mr. Zheng Xiaoyu, the Director General of State Food and Drug Administration; Honorary Chairman, Mr. Gu Jiaqi, the Senior Vice Chairman of China Federation of Industrial Economics; Specially Invited Advisor, Mr. Yu Mingde, the Executive Chairman of China Pharmaceutical Enterprise Management Association.

The other executives and vice Chairman of CPIA are from top executives the prominent pharmaceutical companies, including large and medium-sized state-owned companies and nongovernmental enterprises. Some are also from senior management of famous Sino-foreign pharmaceutical joint ventures, commercial corporations as well as top leaders of regional pharmaceutical industry associations. As China further improves its market environment and deepens its economic reform, there is a wider space for CPIA to develop its business and it is playing a more important role in the industry. With the improvement of the CPIA service, CPIA will engage more activities in pharmaceutical companies' restructuring and reorganizations, technical transfer, research innovations, in discussing the sustained growth of the industry, two markets and two kinds of resources.
