= Paul Appermont =

Belgian businessman (born 1946)

- Born: 1946 (age 79–80); Bilzen
- Education: Katholieke Universiteit Leuven (Leuven, Belgium); Graduate Institute of International Studies (IUHEI) (Geneva, Switzerland)
- Occupation: Businessman

Paul Appermont (born 1946 in Bilzen) is a Belgian businessman. Together with Joos Horsten, he laid the foundation of Xi'an Janssen Pharmaceutical. Appermont is a member of the board of EuropaBio.

== Education ==
Appermont graduated with a PhD in Law at the Katholieke Universiteit Leuven (Leuven, Belgium) and in International Relations at the Graduate Institute of International Studies (IUHEI) (Geneva, Switzerland).

== Career ==
Paul Appermont started his career at Janssen Pharmaceutica as company lawyer. In 1979, he and Joos Horsten were sent to Xi'an, the capital of Shaanxi province, in the People's Republic of China by Dr. Paul Janssen to prepare for the establishment of a pharmaceutical company. In 1986, he started working for Biogen in Switzerland as a Vice President of trade and licensing. In 1996, he joined Jean-Louis Gentilini in the development of Medicard. He now works as a consultant for Innogenetics and the biotech industry.

== Xi'an Janssen background ==
The venture Appermont helped prepare became Xi'an Janssen Pharmaceutical Co., Ltd., set up in 1985 as the first Western pharmaceutical company in the People's Republic of China. Its first Chinese partner was Hanjiang Pharmaceuticals of Hanzhong in Shaanxi province, a sister city of Turnhout, the Belgian town where Paul Janssen laid the foundation of Janssen Pharmaceutica. Hanjiang was one of the original Chinese shareholders of Xi'an Janssen and remained one in 2013. Joos Horsten, Appermont's fellow envoy, was responsible for realizing the joint venture.
