= Pharmaceutical industry in China =

The pharmaceutical industry is one of the leading industries in the People's Republic of China, covering synthetic chemicals and drugs, prepared Chinese medicines, medical devices, apparatus and instruments, hygiene materials, packing materials, and pharmaceutical machinery. China has the second-largest pharmaceutical market in the world as of 2017 which is worth US$110 billion. China accounts for 20% of the world's population but only a small fraction of the global drug market. China's changing health-care environment is designed to extend basic health insurance to a larger portion of the population and give individuals greater access to products and services. Following the period of change, the pharmaceutical industry is expected to continue its expansion.

China, as of 2007, has around 3,000 to 6,000 domestic pharmaceutical manufacturers and around 14,000 domestic pharmaceutical distributors. The most often-cited adverse factors in the marketplace include a lack of protection of intellectual property rights, a lack of visibility for drug approval procedures, a lack of effective governmental oversight, poor corporate support for drug research, and differences in the treatment in China that are accorded to local and foreign firms.

Research and development are increasing, with Shanghai becoming one of the most important global drug research centers. Most notably, Novartis is expected to establish a large Research and development base in Shanghai that will be a pillar of its drug development.

== Overview ==
China has established a pharmaceutical industry structure, and has become one of the largest pharmaceutical producers in the world. However, the industry is still small-scale with a scattered geographical layout, duplicated production processes, and outdated manufacturing technology and management structures. The Chinese pharmaceutical industry also has a low market concentration and weak international trading competitiveness, coupled with a lack of patented domestically-developed pharmaceuticals. (Barnet Siu; 2010)

Investment conditions in China have improved due to the vast consumer demand for pharmaceuticals, the lower labor costs and the changes resulting from the reform and opening up. Changes to the patenting laws in full compliance with the requirement of the Agreement on Trade-Related Aspects of Intellectual Property Rights (or "TRIPS Agreement") and the lack of Chinese pharmaceutical R&D have also left gaps in the market.

The domestic pharmaceutical industry has been a key contributor to the country's impressive economic growth. As one of the world's major producers of pharmaceuticals, the sector achieved an annual compound growth rate of 16.7% between 1978 and 2003. Both far outpaced other economies in the world, making China the world's fastest growing pharmaceutical market. Although China has enjoyed the benefits of an expansive market for pharmaceutical production and distribution, the industry is suffering from minimal innovation and investment in R&D and new product development. The sector's economies of scale have yet to be achieved. Most domestic manufacturers in the pharmaceutical industry lack the autonomic intellectual property and financial resources to develop their own brand products. Most manufacturers rely on the repetitive production of low value added bulk pharmaceuticals and imitation drugs.

== History ==
During the Republic of China era, western-style medicine was mostly not present in the Chinese countryside, although there was some western-style medicine available via missionary-run institutions.

In 1943, scientist Tang Feifan led a team in Kunming which produced China's first batch of penicillin. In 1944, the Chinese Communist Party began manufacturing penicillin in the Yan'an Soviet. In the early People's Republic of China, the pharmaceutical industry was shaped by geopolitical pressures, such as the Korean War and the United States embargo against China, including the U.S. embargo's prohibition on exporting penicillin to China.

== Structure and trends ==
In 2013, China had about 3,500 drug companies, falling from more than 5,000 in 2004, according to government figures. The number is expected to drop further. The domestic companies compete in the $10 billion market without a dominant leader. As of 2007, China is the world's ninth drug market, and in 2008 it will become the eighth largest market.

China's thousands of domestic companies account for 70 percent of the market, and the top 10 companies about 20 percent, according to Business China. In contrast, the top 10 companies in most developed countries control about half the market. Since 30 June 2004, the State Food and Drug Administration (SFDA) has been closing down manufacturers that do not meet the new GMP standards. Foreign players account for 10% to 20% of overall sales, depending on the types of medicines and ventures included in the count. But sales at the top-tier Chinese companies are growing faster than at Western ones, according to IMS Health Inc.

Even the top selling companies just barely exceed sales of $100 million (hospital market). Most of the Chinese drug-makers fall below the 20th ranking, but 30 of the top 50 companies are local.

In addition, China's over-the-counter market is growing fast and has become the fourth largest OTC market in the world. Foreign enterprises have been closely monitoring the expanding OTC market. Merck announced the launch of OTC program in China in September 2003. Roche listed China as one of its 10 core OTC markets, with the aim of growing its OTC drug sales by 50% in the next five years and reaching 1.3 billion in 2008. Novartis is expanding its OTC market share in China, and Wyeth has also entered OTC market.

The pharmaceutical market in China is dominated by its non-branded generic industry that operates with basic technology and simple production methods. Domestic pharmaceuticals are not as technologically advanced as western products, but nonetheless occupy approximately 70% of the market in China. Domestic companies are mainly government owned and fraught with overproduction and losses. The Chinese government has begun consolidating and upgrading the industry in an effort to compete with foreign corporations.

It is estimated that most hospitals derive 25–60% of their revenue from prescription sales, hospitals remain the main outlets for distributing pharmaceuticals in China. This will change with the separation of hospital pharmacies from healthcare services and with the growing numbers of retail pharmacy outlets. Retail pharmacy outlets are expected to grow in number once the government finally introduces its system to classify drugs as OTC. The government is now encouraging development of chain drug stores, but the full effect might not be seen for several years.

The price of pharmaceutical products will continue to decrease steadily. In June 2004, the price of 400 antibiotics in 24 categories, including penicillin, was reduced by, on average, 35%. The total value affected by this reduction was US$42 million. The central government has been playing a significant role in pharmaceutical price readjustment. The government compelled and continually 32 times reduced the price of most of the drugs in last 20 years since 2016. Future price reductions will originate from hospital pharmaceutical retail shops.

The rural pharmaceutical market will shift significantly. 80% of counterfeit products are consumed in rural areas. This provides a huge opportunity for pharmaceutical companies to develop the market in rural areas. In 2005, Huanan Pharmaceutical Group, Guangzhou Ruobei Huale, Baiyunshan Pharmaceutical Group, and others, have stepped up efforts in targeting the rural market.

The China Pharmaceutical Equipment Industry 2015 Market Research Report is a professional and in-depth study on the current state of the Pharmaceutical Equipment industry.

=== Historic foreign involvement ===
Bayer of Germany, the inventor of aspirin, began trade with China in as early as 1882. Hoechst AG, known as Aventis, sold its products through 128 distribution agents across China in 1887, becoming China's no. 1 Western medicine and dyeing provider. Eli Lilly and Company opened its first overseas representative office in Shanghai in 1918. ICI, the predecessor of the world's no. 3 pharmaceutical enterprise AstraZeneca, began trade with China in 1898.

=== Production levels ===
In the 9 months from January to September 2004, the total output of the country's pharmaceutical industry reached $40 billion, 15.8% higher than the same period of 2003. In the same period, 23 major state-owned pharmaceutical companies had sales of $10 billion. A survey of 16 typical city hospitals, the usage of drugs increased by 32.23% in the first half of 2004 as compared with that of 2003.

Around 36% of all China's pharmaceutical enterprises are state-owned. Another 35% are privately owned domestic enterprises and the remaining 29%, foreign-funded. Synthetic drug manufacturing remains the pharmaceutical industry's largest business in China, constituting 65% of industry sales. Another 21% of industry sales come from traditional Chinese medicine. Biotech-related medical products and medical equipment make up the rest.

==== Regional distribution ====
China’s population and its biopharmaceutical sector are factors in the country's pharmaceutical market. Zhejiang, Guangdong, Shanghai, Jiangsu, and Hebei provinces were the five most productive provinces in China between 1998 and 2003. During this period, these provinces grew by an average of 20 percent annually, with the exception of Jiangsu in 1998 and 1999.

Most pharmaceutical firms are located in the southeastern zone that includes two well-developed areas and three under-developed areas. The two most popular areas of well-developed pharmaceutical industry, called the growth poles, are the Eastern China zone of which Zhejiang province is located in the centre and the South China zone represented by the Guangdong province. The total output value of these two provinces accounted for 21 per cent of the total output value of pharmaceutical industry of China in 2003.

The three sub-developed areas of pharmaceutical industry, called the potential points, are also identified as the Middle China Zone, the Northeastern Zone and the Southwestern Zone, centralised in Hebei Province, Heilongjiang province and Sichuan province, respectively.

The development of the pharmaceutical industry in China was found to be predominantly driven by economic factors. The nature of an industrial region can roughly fall into one of the following three types: natural resource-driven region, economy-driven region and science and technology-driven region. The pharmaceutical industry in China grows well only in areas with a strong macroeconomic background rather than in regions with rich natural resources or advanced science and technology. Moreover, it is shown that the stronger the macro-economy, the faster the pharmaceutical industry grows. Therefore, the decision-making policy on pharmaceutical development in a region should be largely based on its macroeconomic situation.

Broadly speaking, it appears that the dynamic features of the pharmaceutical industry in China remain steady. According to the reform plan, China will conduct a regime of vertical management in drug supervision and management departments, intensify supervision and control over medicines, and gradually set up a drug management system featuring legal management, unified law enforcement, standard codes of conduct, honest practice and high efficiency. To meet the objective requirements of drug administration and the needs of the development of medical services, a drug supervision and management body was formed in 1998.

The pharmaceutical industry in China was found to be extensively fragmented. Excessive repetitive establishment of provincial pharmaceutical industries was found to be serious in comparison to other industries in China. It also demonstrates a low-level, repetitive development situation of the pharmaceutical industry in different regions of China.

Currently in China, the pharmaceutical industry is undoubtedly still developing. The most desirable strategy has been, therefore, to concentrate on the regional pharmaceutical industries. There are three main reasons for this strategy: high profitability and growth of the pharmaceutical industry, unnecessary political competition among regions, and excessive exploitation of regional administrative power. (Hu Yuanjia; 2007)

The pharmaceutical industry is always known as a high-return and rapidly growing industry. After the Chinese market was reformed, China gradually makes space for a healthy, steady and rapidly developing pharmaceutical industry, where profit rate and growth rate are much higher than in other industries. In the view of high profit returns, regional governments often allow excessive development of regional medicine industries without careful analysis of regional competitiveness, actual advantages and development strategies to incentivise the regional development of the entire economy.

In China, drug administration departments are established at both central and regional governmental level. Every region has a regional drug administration department with some authority and power. Without good communication and cooperation between administration department, unnecessary competition between regions might occur. The number of drug companies under each administrative department is often wrongly recorded resulting in an inaccurate evaluation index of the regional economic development and governmental performance.

Complex regulatory processes induce excessive exploitation of regional administrative power. Before the revision of Chinese Pharmaceutical Law in 2001, the province drug administration was assigned with authority to streamline the process of registering a generic drug. Consequently, this regional authority power was exploited resulting in excessive duplication of the same drugs. For example, a fluoroquinolone type medicine was registered and manufactured by more than 1,000 enterprises. Fortunately, the Chinese government immediately realised the serious problem and withdrew the regional authority power to prevent overlapping of authorities. Duplication of drug is, however, not the only example. After the allocation of authority of approval right of opening drug companies was taken down to provincial level several years ago, a sharp increase in the number of drug companies was noted. It was reported that 70 new drug production enterprises were approved to open during the first half of 2003, while only 45 similar enterprises were approved to open during the three years from 1998 to 2001.

=== Research and development ===
With their low budget for research and development, China's pharmaceutical makers are in a different league from the multinationals, but they do enjoy certain advantages. Many Chinese companies not only produce the dosage forms (such as tablets) but also own the pharmacies where they are dispensed, as well as the distribution networks that deliver them to the hospitals, where nearly 80% of drugs are sold. In addition, Chinese companies can produce generic versions of branded drugs for a fraction of their price.

Of the 3,000 pharmaceuticals – not including traditional medicines – manufactured in China since the 1950s, 99 percent are copies of foreign products, as are almost 90 percent of China's biotech products. Most Chinese companies – even joint ventures – compete with each other for the same generics. Many are struggling for survival; more than 32 percent recorded losses in 1999, according to the Pharmaceutical Department of National Development and Reform Commission.

Moreover, compared with international pharma giants, Chinese companies are not only small, but are weak in technology and often lack capital. The total R&D expenditures for Chinese-owned pharma businesses amounted to less than that spent by a single major Western pharma company.

There are presently more than 5,000 research and development (R&D) institutions in China, but only a handful of them are able to compete internationally in certain areas.

The R&D system consists of specialized research institutes, major universities, biotechnology companies, and R&D divisions of large pharmaceutical enterprises. In recent years, mid- and small-size biotechnology companies are developing at a rapid pace. There are more than 1,000 such entities nationwide at present, and more than 30% of them are privately owned. Special governmental funds are available to promote this type of entrepreneurship.

During the past several years, some Chinese pharmaceutical companies began to establish R&D infrastructures largely due to internal growth needs, but their primary focus is directed toward improving existing technologies or developing generic version of new drugs.

Companies to expand research efforts in China include GlaxoSmithKline, Bayer, Bristol-Myers Squibb, Merck & Co and Eli Lilly & Company.

=== Comparison of Chinese and Western pharmaceutical companies ===
Like its U.S. and European counterparts, the Chinese pharma business is regulated by government agencies, and competition is fierce in the business. The biggest differences include following:

- most Chinese pharma companies are generic drug manufacturers;
- a large number are traditional Chinese medicine manufacturers;
- hospitals are still the major drug market;
- patent issues are the greatest weakness of Chinese producers.

When the Chinese are developing an API they try patent searches via the internet, but are limited by the scope of the available services. Few factories yet have patent attorneys on staff, but for the larger pharma groups who are seeking partnerships with large Western firms, this may come soon.

The Chinese business environment is mainly relationship-based, and this is reflected in the pharmaceutical business. Establishing relationship with a pharma companies through personal connections is a common way to contact Chinese pharma companies. Attending pharmaceutical exhibitions, pharmaceutical conferences or seminars is another approach, as is holding a press conference attended by officials of related government agencies or associations and senior pharmaceutical executives.

=== Domestic companies ===
From 2003 to 2004, the number of pharmacies climbed to 200,000 from 180,000, and the number of retailers owning chain stores rose from 1200 to 1349.

Before the 1980s, the distribution channel for China's pharmacy products was vertically integrated, as there were few middlemen for medicine sales and the only wholesalers were the traditional pharmacy stores. However, after the 1980s, with the deepening of China's reforms, the distribution of China's pharmacy products have undergone profound changes that have to some extent changed this.

At present, there are three main distribution channels for China's pharmacy enterprises:

- Pharmacy enterprises – national general agent – sub wholesaler – retailers – patients

Under this distribution form, there is a sole authorized organization in the country that is responsible for the sale of one or more products of a pharmacy company. Such kind of distribution also can be called "the national agent mode." The pharmacy company is responsible for the manufacturing, research and development of the products, and the general agent for the nationwide sale of the products of the company. There are mainly three national distribution agencies in mainland before 2010: Sinopharm Group, Shanghai Pharma and CR Pharmaceutical. In most cases, the agents buy the pharmacy products with cash after weighing the costs and profits, and the market risks lie with the wholesalers.

- Pharmacy enterprises – regional general agents (sub wholesalers) – retailers – patients

Under this mode, the pharmacy enterprise search for its national or regional general agent and use the agent's market network to sell its products. Such kind of distribution mode can be called "the regional general agent mode." The pharmacy enterprise usually entrusts its general agent with the sale of its products through a bidding process or forming alliance with the agent, providing it products at a bottom price. The agent, after buying a certain amount of products, win the authorization from the pharmacy company to sell in a specific region and becomes its sole authorized agent in the region. The regional general agent can be the general wholesaler in a big region, provincial wholesaler, district wholesaler or municipal wholesaler, etc. In a big region or in a province, regional general agents provide patients with their products through sub-wholesalers and retailers. In a small place such as a county, products can go directly from the regional general agent to retailers and then to patients, without the involvement of sub wholesalers.

- Marketing companies of pharmacy enterprises – local offices of pharmacy companies – retailers – patients

Before taking such a distribution channel, the pharmacy enterprise should first register an independent licensed marketing company, and then set up offices in major cities which are responsible for monitoring sales and distribution of its products in their respective regions. Such a distribution mode, which requires large amount of capital and high-level management for the pharmacy enterprise, is mostly used by large-sized pharmacy enterprises.

In the above-mentioned modes, pharmacy enterprises, middlemen and patients are three basic components. Middlemen can also be classified under the categories of wholesalers and retailers. Retailers include those with shops, without shops and retail groups. What needs to be pointed out is that in China, the biggest pharmacy retailer is the hospital, due to the country's medicare and social security mechanisms. In the retail market, 85% of pharmacy products go to patient through hospitals.

Hence, the major distribution channels in China can also be described as the following:

- pharmacy enterprises—hospitals-patients; pharmacy enterprises—wholesalers—hospitals—patients;
- pharmacy enterprises—agents—wholesalers—retailers—patients;
- pharmacy enterprises—retailers—patients.

The first two modes are the leading ones in China.

In recent years, China's pharmacy enterprises have entered two new fields: e-business and the setting up of pharmacy retailing chain stores. At present, the development of the B to C mode of pharmacy business in China is limited.

B2B is the main development trend of China's e-pharmacy commerce. Though the trade volume of B2B e-pharmacy business makes up only a percentage of the total pharmacy sales, it still has large development potential. In China's case, B2B e-pharmacy commerce has grown by 300 percent yearly. In 2003, the trade volume of internet pharmacy sales was estimated to be 10 percent of the total.

In addition, more and more IT and other industry lead companies have been shifting their investments into the pharmaceutical industry. One example is Fang Zheng Group, an IT company that had invested a total of US$363 million into pharmaceuticals and healthcare. Guangzhou Bai Yun Shan Pharmaceutical Manufactory earmarked US$12 million to start an external-use medicine project, which was in addition to its US$48 million antibiotics project.

=== Domestic companies doing R&D ===
To date, the Chinese domestic pharmaceutical industry has invested very little in the research and development of new drugs, though the central government is encouraging R&D through investment and other incentives in an effort to build a world-class pharmaceutical industry.

- Jiangsu Hengrui Medicine Co. Ltd. (SHA: 600276), headquartered in Lianyungang, Jiangsu Province, is one of the leading pharmaceutical companies in China. Hengrui always values R&D and has R&D office in Liangyugang since 1994. In 2000 and 2011, Shanghai R&D center and Chengdu R&D center were established, respectively. Hengrui's investment in R&D remains high and consecutively ranks at top positions in China in recent years. Hengrui's R&D involves oncology, metabolic disease, cardiovascular disease, inflammation, and diseases in central nervous system and immune system, etc., and is well known for its innovative anti-cancer drugs. Apatinib, e.g., which was approved by China FDA (CFDA) in December 2014, has been the first small molecule anti-angiogenesis targeted treatment for advanced gastric cancer in the world. Hengrui's R&D activities have expanded overseas – the R&D offices have been set up in the US, Japan and Australia, and collaborations have been formed with a number of renowned international pharmaceutical companies and institutes – Incyte, Tasoko and MD Anderson Cancer Center.
- Shijiazhuang Pharma Group: Based in Shijiazhuang, the capital city of Hebei Province in northeast China, the pharma group is one of the largest pharma industries of China. In November 2004, the group announced the official launch of its investigative drug butylphthalide (NBP). The group acquired patents of the drug from Chinese Academy of Medical Sciences for less than $4 million, and spent only $6.3 million on clinical trials. Shijiazhuang Pharma Group is very typical in the new drug development. The company uses three ways: first, develop new drugs in collaboration with universities and research institutes; second, apply for generic drugs rights before patented drugs' patents expire; and third, modernize the traditional Chinese medicines (TCM), that is, develop TCMs in the same quantitative way as is used in developing chemical drugs. The third way was used in the development of butylphthalide, a traditional Chinese medicine extracted from celery seeds.
- Wuxi Pharmatech: WuXi PharmaTech (Cayman), Inc., through its subsidiaries, operates as a pharmaceutical and biotechnology research and development outsourcing company in the People's Republic of China. It provides a portfolio of laboratory and manufacturing services in the drug discovery and development process to pharmaceutical and biotechnology companies. In addition, WuXi PharmaTech's services include process development, such as process research and process optimization services to assist customers to manufacture their drug candidates; and manufacturing of advanced intermediates, which are drug materials prior to refinement into active pharmaceutical ingredients. Listed on the New York Stock Exchange: Stock symbol ADR (NYSE) WX.
- Harbin Pharmaceutical Group Co. is about to become more competitive, with a planned $250 million capital infusion from two foreign investors, Warburg Pincus of New York and CITIC Capital of Hong Kong. That money will allow Harbin to expand its R&D efforts—the company spends about 5% of revenue on R&D, exceptional for a Chinese drug maker yet just a third of what most multinationals spend—and help it become predator rather than prey as the consolidation in the pharmaceutical industry gets more ferocious.
- Sinovac Biotech Ltd. (AMEX:SVA) has recently launched marketing of Bilive and expects to record its first sales in May 2005 a combined Hepatitis A&B vaccine. This is the first combined inactivated Hepatitis A&B vaccine developed by Chinese scientists, and the vaccine has only one directly competing combined Hepatitis A&B vaccine in the world, GSK's Twinrix, which is not available in China and sells for a much higher price than Bilive in countries where it is for sale. In 2004, the company had sales about $6.5 million sales, more than two times 2003 sales. Sinovac now has two vaccines fully approved for sale in China. It is currently the world leader in the development of a SARS vaccine.
- Zensun (Shanghai) Sci & Tech Co., Ltd is a bio-tech pharmaceutical company well-versed in the demands of the international market with a high profit potential based on innovation. It is devoted to the research and development of new drugs through self-owned intellectual properties. With adherence to the tenet of "healing for life", Zensun has long been focusing on the research of anti-tumor drugs and anti-heart failure drugs. Based on the innovative theory, Zensun has successfully developed two drugs: Recombinant Human Neuregulin-1 injection, an anti-heart failure drug, and Recombinant Human ErbB3 fragment injection, a therapeutic vaccine against tumors, both of which have undergone clinical trials. In 2006, Zensun (Shanghai) set up a subsidiary company, Zensun (USA), Inc., in San Diego, CA to manage FDA filing, clinical trials and commercialization process of Recombinant Human Neuregulin-1 (Neucardin), an exciting and novel treatment for chronic heart failure, as well as other compounds developed by Zensun (Shanghai). In 2009, Zensun (USA) was approved by the US FDA to conduct a Phase 2a US-based trial of Neucardin administration to subjects with NYHA Class II and III Chronic Heart Failure.
- Tonghua Dongbao Pharmaceuticals Ltd., founded in 1985, is a bio-tech pharmaceutical with headquarters, research and manufacturing facilities situated in China's Northern city of Tonghua. In 1998 Tonghua Dongbao became the 3rd company worldwide to successfully develop and manufacture its own recombinant human insulin line, Gansulin, for the treatment of Diabetes Mellitus. Its recombinant human insulin production base is the largest of its kind in Asia, producing both vials of insulin and insulin cartridges for the Gansulin Insulin Pen. The company is accelerating expansion into markets outside of China, currently exporting insulin and a variety of other medicine to over 10 countries.

=== Foreign expansion ===
Most Chinese pharma companies with foreign distribution export traditional Chinese medicine mainly to Asian countries or regions. Their foreign distribution, therefore, is not as significant as their western counterparts.

The Chinese government legalized foreign ownership of retail pharmacies in 2003. On 14 March 2005, AXM Pharma Inc. (AMEX: AXJ) entered into a distribution agreement with Sinopharm Holding Guangzhou Co., Ltd. for an expected purchase amount through December 2005 of RMB 54 million ($6.56 million) for the company's line of Elegance products, formerly known as Whisper.

Additional products, including Anti-Fatigue and Asarone, are expected to be sold in upcoming quarters. The sales territory includes Guangdong, Guangxi, Yunnan, Guizhou, Fujian, Sichuan, Chongqing, Hainan, Hubei and Hunan.

Sinopharm Holding Guangzhou Co., Ltd., an affiliate of China National Pharmaceutical Group Corp. is actively engaged in the research and development, capital investment, manufacture and trade of pharmaceuticals and medical instruments. Sinopharm has achieved an annual sales volume of 10 billion RMB (over 1.2 billion U.S. Dollars) and a total import and export volume of 200 million U.S. Dollars.

=== Foreign companies ===
In recent years, more and more western pharmaceutical corporations, such as Pfizer, GSK, Roche, Novo, have set up commercial operations and R&D centers in China. Many world leading pharmaceutical companies have established joint venture manufactories in China. Some have even set up sole propriety manufactories. As of 2004, amongst the largest 500 overseas enterprises, 14 of them are pharmaceutical companies.

As of 2004 (three years after China's WTO entry), nearly all global pharmaceutical companies have already completed their accession into the Chinese market and will gradually shift their focus to research development. The main reasons for overseas companies coming to China have been to save costs by using the extensive science and technology research bases currently in place in China, the abundant human resources, and less expensive medical and clinical trials.

=== Foreign production ===
The involvement of many foreign pharmacy enterprises operating in China can be dated back to a century ago. Bayer of Germany, the inventor of aspirin, began trade with China in as early as 1882. Hoechst AG, known as Aventis, sold its products through 128 distribution agents across China in 1887, becoming China's No.1 Western medicine and dyeing provider. The US Eli Lilly & Co. opened its first overseas representative office in China's Shanghai in 1918. ICI, the predecessor of the world's No 3 pharmacy enterprise AstraZeneca, began trade with China in 1898, and still maintained its old-time office by the Huangpu River in Shanghai.

As of 2007, there were already 1,800 foreign-funded pharmaceutical enterprises in China. Currently, all the top 20 pharmaceutical companies in the world have set up joint ventures or wholly owned facilities in China. This suggests that market conditions have never been more challenging, with competition at an all-time high.

- Pfizer produces and markets more than 40 innovative drugs in China, and the quality of its products all met the Chinese Pharmacopeia. Pfizer has GMP manufacturing facilities in Dalian, Suzhou and Wuxi. Its Dalian facility, built in 1989 jointly with Dalian Pharmaceuticals was the first to get GMP certification in China. Pfizer has invested more than $500 million in China. Lastly, in 2012 Pfizer established a joint venture with Hisun Pharmaceuticals (Hisun 51% – Pfizer 49%) to market branded generics under the label Hisun-Pfizer.
- GlaxoSmithKline has more than 2000 employees in China, and its drugs are sold in 60 cities. The company mainly sells drugs treating HBV, asthmas and infections.
- Merck sells antibiotics, prostate drugs, cardiovascular drugs, pain relievers, osteoporosis and vaccines. It set up its first joint venture in China in 1994.
- Novartis has invested about 100 million in China, with four manufacturing facilities in Beijing and Shanghai (Changsu). Its core businesses involve patented drugs, generic drugs, eye protection drugs and health products. Novartis Beijing was founded by Novartis AG and Beijing Pharmaceutical group and Beijing Zizhu Pharmaceuticals in 1987, the first foreign pharmaceutical company in China.
- Sanofi-Aventis The German-French company sells several drugs in China. Sanofi Aventis runs three facilities in Beijing, Shenzhen and Hangzhou; currently, they're in the process of building a brand new Vaccine Plant outside Shenzhen.
- AstraZeneca Pharmaceutical Co. has its headquarters in Shanghai, with 25 branch offices in major cities across China's mainland. In 2001, the company established its largest manufacturing site in Asia with a total investment of $170 million in Wuxi. It sells several products, including Seroquel and Nexium. It has nearly 3,000 employees working in manufacturing, sales, clinical research and new product development. It has a presence in more than 110 targeted cities, with around 800 representatives.
- Bristol-Myers Squibb is one of the earliest to enter Chinese market.
- Johnson & Johnson sells Tynoline and other drugs in China.
- Wyeth's best-seller in China includes Calcium-D.
- Roche launched a medical education campaign targeting 3,500 doctors in 20 Chinese cities in 2004.
- Schering-Plough is a worldwide pharmaceutical company committed to discovering, developing and marketing of new medicines that can improve people's health and extend life. The company is the recognized leader in biotechnology, genomics and gene therapy. Shanghai Schering-Plough Pharmaceutical Co., Ltd, with a total investment of US 37 million, was founded on 5 August 1994 as a joint-venture, with Shanghai Pharmaceutical Industry (Group) Corporation and Shanghai Corporation of Pharmaceutical Economic and Technical International Cooperation.
- Bayer Greater China is Bayer's second largest single market in Asia, accounting for approximately one quarter of regional sales. Its interests in this region have grown steadily over the years, from step-by-step investment in the early 1990s to large-scale, world-class facilities today. Bayer's investment in our integrated production site in the Shanghai Chemical Industry Park makes it evident that Bayer regards Greater China as one of its most important markets worldwide. Bayer's Greater China Group operates in the market encompassing Hong Kong, Taiwan, and China. The Bayer Group in Greater China is led by management holding companies, with the subgroups and production joint ventures operating independently under their strategic direction. The Country Group Speaker, Dr. Elmar Stachels, leads the Group in Greater China. The Greater China Group employs ca. 2,800 people across a wide range of functions. Companies and Locations: Bayer currently operates 18 companies in Greater China. Eight of them now have production facilities on stream in all business segments in which the company is active. Local production accounts for an increasing proportion of sales. Bayer China is engaged in a number of cooperation projects with some of the foremost research institutes and universities in China, to conduct research in the field of innovative materials, health care and crop science. It strongly cooperates with the Chinese Academy of Science and affiliated institutes such as the Institute of Materia Medica and the Kunming Institute of Botany in Yunnan with the aim to identify new compounds in the healthcare and crop science field. There are also a number of projects currently being started in polymers research. In addition, Bayer also supports a number of chairs and programmes for research and teaching at Chinese universities. These include the Tsinghua-Bayer Public Health and HIV/AIDS Media Studies Program, a national platform designed to play a key role in China's public health system. Furthermore, Bayer HealthCare supports a chair for Healthcare Management at the China European International Business School (CEIBS) in Shanghai.
- Boehringer Ingelheim entered Chinese market in 1995 and invested $25 million in a new facility in Shanghai in 2002. Its drugs treating respiratory diseases and cardiovascular diseases have established well in Chinese pharmaceutical markets.
- Hoechst Marion Russel established its China head offices in Beijing in 1995 to manage operations in mainland China and Hong Kong. HMR has two joint ventures in China, Hoechst Huabei Pharmaceuticals Ltd in Shijiazhuang, a heartland of the Chinese pharmaceutical industry, and Hoechst Shanghai International Pharmaceuticals Ltd.
- Eli Lilly set up its first overseas office in Shanghai in 1918 and returned to Shanghai, China in 1993. Its main facility is in Suzhou, Jiangsu province and main products include Ceclor, insulin, and erectile dysfunction drug ED.
- Abbott Laboratories Ltd sells a series of products including baby food in China.
- Xian-Janssen: Among foreign-invested ventures in China, Xian-Janssen Pharmaceutical, located in Xi'an is regarded as a model. It has ranked among the top 10 joint ventures in terms of revenue since 1991, thrice landing in the number one spot. The company's success is due partly to its product line, which includes a range of high-volume sellers: medicines to treat gastrointestinal problems, fungi, allergies and pain, as well as psychosis and epilepsy. But it was Dr. Paul Janssen's decision to enter China early, to invest inland, and to keep investment plans moving along in the wake of 1989 Tiananmen Square event that have helped build its good relations with the Chinese government. Paul Appermont and Joos Horsten lead the Xian-Janssen Pharmaceutical project.
- Degussa is shifting a large proportion of its pharmaceutical chemicals production from Europe to China in order to take advantage of low-cost manufacturing and improved production efficiencies in the country. At the same time, the company will restructure some of its large production facilities, the vast majority of them in Germany, which could result in the transfer of the manufacture of other products to China.
- Rhodia is improving its competitive position in analgesics by reinforcing its more cost-effective manufacturing operations. The company is making a major investment in its Wuxi, China, paracetamol (acetaminophen or APAP) production facility and consolidating its North American and European operations. Rhodia shuttered its Luling, La., paracetamol operations in 2004 and consolidated production in Roussillon, France, and Wuxi, China. Following these changes, paracetamol production capacity will be adjusted to match current levels.

Japanese companies:

- Sankyo: Having previously generated revenues from exports to local agencies allied with its own marketing, Sankyo completed a plant for manufacturing its drugs in October 2003, and plans to expand its own marketing. It expects to double the number of marketing representatives (MRs) to 130 in 2004, and increase sales in China from ¥3.0 billion currently (company estimate for 2003) to ¥5.0 billion within a few years. Sankyo already markets hyperlipemic Mevalotin, anti-inflammatory Loxonin, and antibiotic Banan in China, and plans to market hypertensive Olmesartan (currently under development) there in future.
- Takeda: The company basically does its own marketing (sales value estimated to be ¥1–2 billion). It also has a manufacturing plant. In 2004 Takeda planned to launch diabetes drug Actos in China, and then it will be marketing all four global products (Actos, anti-ulcer Takepron, cancer drug Leuplin, and hypertensive Blopress). However, the US has priority in its overseas strategy, followed by Europe and then Asia.
- Yamanouchi: The firm moved into China in 1994 and does most of its own marketing, covering anti-ulcer Gaster and urinary impediment treatment Harnal among its leading products. Sales are gradually expanding, and operating profitability was achieved in 2001. Accumulated losses have been wiped out during F2003. The company owns a manufacturing plant. In 2004, there are plans to launch Dolner for peripheral circulation, anti-emetic Nazea OD, and hypertensive Hypoca. Yamanouchi does not have plans to increase its 110 MRs significantly at this point.
- Daiichi: Shifted to in-house marketing after establishing a sales subsidiary in 1998, mainly selling synthetic antibacterials Cravit (oral and injectable) and Tarivid. It originally planned to launch neurotransmission enhancer Translon too, but after development was halted in Japan, development in China also ended. In 1998, it forecast sales of ¥12.0 billion in 2002, but only actually recorded ¥1.6 billion. Sales are behind plan chiefly due to the suspension of Translon's development and the proliferation of generic and copycat versions of Cravit. On the earnings side, Daiichi expects to move into operating profit in F2004 as Cravit sales expand. It does not currently plan to expand its force of MRs much from 140 to 150, but expects to do so when urinary impediment treatment KMD-3213 (Phase 1 under preparation) is launched, which will be 2007 at the earliest.
- Tanabe: Markets in-house products such as hypertensive Herbesser and Tanatril. Tanabe does not disclose medium-term targets, but plans to double the number of MRs to 200 by the end of 2005. No products are currently in clinical trials, but there are a number of development candidates.
- Mitsubishi Tanabe Pharma: The China subsidiary Kuangchou Green Cross has been extending transfusion business (manufacturing, sales) since the days of the former Green Cross, but both sales and profits have been flat for the past several years. The firm has already sold off its transfusion business in Japan to Otsuka Pharmaceutical as part of its restructuring, and the strategic importance of this is diminishing. Anti-coagulant Novastan, which was approved and launched in China in December 2002, is being sold not via Kuangchou Green Cross but by a local agent.
- Astellas: Immunosuppressant Prograf is being marketed in China by an 80%-owned subsidiary An application has been filed to sell a second product, atopic dermatitis treatment Protopic. It has a relatively large number of MRs at 30–40 (the subsidiary has 60 employees); by comparison, Prograf has 40 MRs in the US. China business is less of a priority for Astellas than the US or Europe, but sees its potential as significant due to the large number of organ transplants. In 2000, there were 5,501 kidney transplants performed in China, second only to the number in the US (13,372). Sales of immunosuppressant drugs are relatively high. The top 30 drugs by sales in China (hospital market base) included two such drugs: Novartis' Neoral at number 22 ($16.1 million), and Roche's CellCept at 23 ($15.8 million).
- Chugai: China is not positioned as a priority market for Chugai, which has focused on Europe since coming under the Roche group. Exports of white blood cell production stimulant Neutrogin account for most of its business in China, with marketing consigned to agents. Kirin's Gran, another GCSF drug, is marketed in China by Kirin itself and recorded 2002 sales of $11.1 million, ranking it 45th in the hospital market.
- Eisai: The firm expanded its own manufacturing and marketing operations into China and Asia earlier than in the European and US markets. Its sales and profits in F2002 and own projections for F2003 place Eisai as number one among Japanese firms in China. Eisai was the first manufacturer among the US, European and Japanese pharmaceutical firms to manufacture in China via a 100% owned subsidiary from the very beginning (founded in 1994). The sales target for 2006 is an ambitious ¥20 billion. By 2006, Eisai plans to increase the number of MRs from 150 to 250, and extend its coverage from 1,000 hospitals in 53 cities to 3,000 hospitals in 100 cities. It already sells two global products, anti-ulcer drug Pariet and Alzheimer's treatment Aricept, and plans to add osteoporosis drug Glakay in 2006.
- Kyowa Hakko: Having previously only exported cancer drugs (a few hundred million yen's worth), Kyowa Hakko plans to get approval and then start marketing itself thehypertensive Coniel at the end of 2004. Ant-allergy Allelock should also go on sale in 2007, with peak sales for the two combined projected by the firm at over ¥2 billion.
- Taisho: The company makes and sells health drinks (tonics) in China, but has no specific plans for prescription drugs. The rights to antibiotic Clarith/Biaxin outside Japan are licensed to Abbott.
- Terumo: Unlike the drug makers, Terumo is using China as a manufacturing base (almost all of its 1,362 employees there are in manufacturing). Its manufacturing subsidiary when set up in 1995 specialized in making products for the Japanese market, but more recently this has been producing and shipping products for the US and Europe as well. Terumo is still in the process of exploring China as a market, however. For more than 20 years, it has sold products using agents in China via its Hong Kong subsidiary, but F2002 sales amounted to only ¥1.3 billion (low-margin products are not handled, so there are profits). It plans to consider the possibility of in-house marketing, going forward.

=== Foreign companies doing R&D in China ===
After China's entry into the WTO, many leading pharmaceutical companies are transferring their research and development centers to China. For instance, Roche of Switzerland opened its R&D center in Shanghai recently, GSK has established its OTC research and development center in Tianjin, China, and Pfizer and Janssen Pharmaceutica (Johnson & Johnson) will carry out similar plans in the near future. AstraZeneca, Bayer, Eli Lilly and Company, and Hoffman-La Roche, have also set up R&D or clinical trial centers in China.

A poll on 33 foreign pharmaceutical enterprises in China shows that seven out of the 33 companies have R&D centers in China, accounting for 22% of the surveyed. The remaining 26 pharmaceutical enterprises have no R&D centers in China, accounting for 78% of the surveyed. All the R&D centers were founded after 1999, mainly in 2000 and 2001.

In January 2004, Roche of Switzerland opened its research and development center, the fifth R&D center of the pharmaceutical giant, and the first to be established in China. Roche planned to hire 40 to 50 scientists in the first year and focus their research on pharmaceutical chemistry study. The center aims to step into traditional Chinese medicine research.

- Novo has a $10 million research-and-development center at the Shangdi High-Technology Park in Beijing.
- Lonza (Basel, Switzerland, www.lonza.com) has opened a facility in Guangzhou, China;
- Discovery Partners International (San Diego, CA, www.dpi, com) has affiliates in China.
- Chiral Quest has a research and development facility at a biotechnology R&D park at Jiashan, China near Shanghai.
- Affymetrix, Inc. and CapitalBio Corporation, a leading life science company based in Beijing, China formed a strategic relationship to jointly develop and co-market a proprietary, advanced GeneChip.

Foreign companies doing drug testing or clinical trials in China:

- SiniWest Holdings; Headquarters: San Diego; Product Tested in China: Drugs to treat breast cancer and peptic ulcers; Current Status: Did preliminary studies in China; plans U.S. research trial.
- Cancer Therapeutics; Headquarters: Los Angeles; Product Tested in China: Treatment involving antibodies that deliver radiation to kill cancer cells; Current Status: Expects approval in China this summer; approval in U.S. still three to four years away.
- FeRx; Headquarters: San Diego; Product Tested in China: Drug to treat liver cancer; Current Status: In research trials in both U.S. and China.
- Frontage Laboratories; Headquarters: Pennsylvania; Products Tested in China: Helping domestic firms to conduct IND enabling studies for new CNS, Cancer and Cardiovascular drugs with GLP operations in Shanghai, GMP operations in Beijing, and Clinical operations in Beijing and Zhengzhou (currently established 150 research beds in two centers); Current Status: In drug development experiments, preclinical and clinical trials in both US and China.

== Governmental policies ==
China's pharmaceutical industry has been a major industry that was completely directed by the state and subject to central planning, upon which transition-era reforms since the 1980s to this day have had a major impact. The pharmaceutical industry has been shaken up following the implementation of several government-initiated structural reforms.

The main reforms included:

1. Requiring all pharmaceutical manufacturers to meet GMP standards by 2004,

2. Diminishing drug sales through hospitals,

3. Bidding publicly for drug purchase,

4. Implementing a national healthcare insurance system, and

5. Strengthening intellectual property protection and SFDA supervision.

The overall goal has been to improve manufacturing and distribution efficiencies, strengthen drug safety supervision, and separate hospitals from the drug retailing business.

== Regulation ==
With the increasing growth of the Chinese pharmaceutical market, the government realised the importance of supervision of pharmaceutical market. They put forward several regulations and reform measures over the past couple of years, especially in the recent period of healthcare reform. The most influential issues for foreign companies are the decree of Administration Method of Import Pharmaceuticals recently promulgated by the State Drug Administration, and the launch of a new version of registration certificate for import pharmaceuticals. Despite these advances China is still the leading manufacturer of counterfeit drugs, which claim the lives of people worldwide every year. In June 2009, Nigeria seized a large consignment of fake anti-malarial drugs with the label of 'made in India' but found that the medicines were in fact produced in China and were imported into the African countries.[4] The authorities maintained that the incident was not isolated, indicating that more fakes were circulating.

=== Regulatory agencies ===
- State Food and Drug Administration: As part of the government restructuring announced in March 1998, the Ministry of Health's Department of Drug Administration merged with the State Pharmaceutical Administration of China (SPAC) to become the State Drug Administration (SDA). As a result, SDA oversees all drug manufacturing, trade, and registration. In 2003, the SDA was restructured to become the State Food and Drug Administration.

Other former functions of the ministry have been assigned to different government bodies. The most important of these was the transfer of medical insurance responsibilities to the new Ministry of Labor and Social Security. Nonetheless, the Ministry of Health retains its other main functions-regulatory development and oversight, healthcare resource allocation, and medical research and education. The Chinese government's establishment of a single drug regulatory authority was an important step toward foreign access, because it eliminated the conflicting standards that prevailed among provincial government agencies, centralized the Chinese healthcare regulatory system, and made it more transparent. SFDA now oversees all medications-both Western and TCM-as well as advertising. Its new regulations follow FDA's model. Depending on the product and circumstance companies seeking to receive pharmaceutical approval might additionally have to register their product with the General Administration of Quality Supervision, Inspection and Quarantine AQSIQ. In July 1999, as part of medical insurance reform, SFDA released its first list of over-the-counter (OTC) medications, and in 2000, the state began to regulate OTC and prescription drugs separately. SFDA did so to encourage patients to purchase OTC medicines for less serious diseases, thereby reducing government medication expenditures and hospital visits. The SFDA plans to cut the number of manufacturers down to around 2,000 over the next two years by attrition and by requiring remaining firms to meet the new GMP standards. In fact, SFDA required all pharmaceutical companies in China to obtain GMP certificates from SFDA by 30 June 2004 to be licensed to sell their drug products in China. About 3000 of the companies met the deadline; companies in the process of obtaining certification may subcontract secondary production to a certified company until 30 June 2005.

In 2005, SFDA launched a regulation on drug research and supervision management aimed at enforcing GLP to investigative drugs, traditional Chinese medicine injections and biotechnology products. The regulation aims to help China's drug research and development gain international recognition.

- National Development and Reform Commission: The function of the agency includes making strategic planning and mid to long term planning for the Chinese pharmaceutical industry, regulating the prices of drugs, managing disaster relief funds and carrying out the pharmaceutical development projects sponsored by the government.
- Ministry of Commerce: The government organization regulates the import and export of medical devices and equipment, collects and analyzes import and export data, and carries out anti-dumping investigations.
- Ministry of Labor and Social Security: The agency is responsible for the management of state medical insurance systems.
- Ministry of Health: The agency guides the reform of the medical service industry, is responsible for clinical trials and clinical applications of drugs, joins with other agencies in monitoring the severe side effects of drugs, and makes the basic insurance drug list.
- State Traditional Chinese Medicine Administration: The agency focuses on policies and regulations related to traditional Chinese MEDICINES.
- State Population and Family Planning Commission: The agency writes the regulations on the use of birth control tools and pills.
- Ministry of Science and Technology: The agency determines new product development projects, evaluates and registers new research and development achievements; issues grants and funds for small to mid business innovative investment.
- State Quality Control Administration: It enacts and implements national standards.
- Industrial Associations: Include China OTC Association, China Pharmaceutical Quality Management Association, China Pharmaceutical Commerce Association, and others.

=== Regulatory requirements ===
China quickly advanced its pharmaceutical-related regulations around the time of its December 2001 entry into the World Trade Organization (WTO). China has strengthened patent protection: In conformity with the WTO/TRIPS agreement, the patent protection structure adopted by China approaches that of Japan, Europe, and the US. Since the end of the 1990s, the government has been striving to develop a healthcare insurance system that covers 200 million Chinese. Already, 90% of the population in major cities like Shanghai, Beijing, and Guangzhou are covered, for a total of over 80 million. The Pharmaceutical Management Law was overhauled in December 2001, and various regulations were enacted from 2002 to 2003. Transparency in the approval process is gradually improving.

Following WTO regulations, China has committed itself to cutting tariffs, liberalizing its domestic distribution practices, and restructuring its regulatory environment. China has allowed foreign enterprises to import products and engage in distribution services. Furthermore, China has also implemented new drug administration laws designed to streamline product registration and protect Intellectual Property Rights (IPR). China has agreed to six years of "data exclusivity" and has committed itself to implementing a patent linkage system. The SFDA has worked to crack down on counterfeiters but without greater resources and stricter legal consequences, these actions alone have yet to be enough to curb this rampant problem.

Since 1998, the government has raised the bar for entering the pharmaceutical business by passing laws including Drug Management Law and Regulations on Pharmaceutical Manufacturing. They involve following aspects of pharmaceutical manufacturing, drug distribution and selling, drug registration, requirements for manufacturing traditional Chinese medicines, medical packaging manufacturing requirements, and medical device manufacturing requirement.

The new laws will likely have an adverse effect on market growth and profitability during the transitional period, but over the next 5–10 years this market should be able to provide the returns.

=== Government drug pricing policy ===
In order to alleviate the burden of medical expenses on the society and ensure the implementation of the medical insurance scheme, retail prices of pharmaceutical products qualified for the program and included in the National Basic Medical Insurance Scheme Drug Catalogue will be regulated. The pricing mechanism is based upon three considerations when setting the maximum retail price – production cost, a wholesaler spread set by the government and the prices of comparable products in the market. Any products priced above this level will be cut.

=== Centralized tendering drug procurement program ===
The centralized tendering procurement system operates in two ways. First, several hospitals and medical institutions join to invite tenders. Then, they appoint qualified agents to handle tenders. These agents are prohibited from having ties with the industry regulatory or administrative bodies.

In 2002, 70% of public hospitals at county or above level implemented this tendering system. This system has successfully passed the pilot phase and proven effective. Both the number of participating hospitals and variety of drugs expanded substantially.

More power to hospitals and medical institutions. In a market economy, hospitals and medical institutions do their own drug procurement. They source drugs from manufacturers at market prices and dispense them to patients. The centralized tendering drug procurement system, however, gives more power to hospitals in drug procurement. As a result, some unfair, unjustified and unreasonable practices surface as decision makers of some hospitals abused their power in order to get economic benefits.

=== GMP compliance certification ===
GMP is a system to ensure products are consistently produced and controlled according to quality standards. It is designed to minimize the risks involved in any pharmaceutical production that cannot be eliminated through testing the final product. A directive circular issued by the Ministry of Health in Jul 95 marked the official launch of GMP certification in China. The China Certification Committee for Drugs (CCCD) was established in the same year. A subsidiary organization was also set up to manage the certification program.

Currently nine government agencies are the key agencies responsible for regulation. They are the State Food and Pharmaceutical Administration (SFDA), the State Development and Reform Committee, the Commerce Ministry, the State Traditional Chinese Medicine Administration, the Ministry of Labor and Social Security, the Ministry of Health, the State Population and Family Planning Committee, the Ministry of Science and Technology, and the State Quality and Technology Supervision Administration.

In addition, more than 10 industrial associations also regulate the industry.

=== Comparison of regulatory requirements with other countries ===
The enforcement of Good Manufacturing Practices has not been adequate in China and the U.S. FDA and EMA (European Medicines Agency) have inspected Chinese pharmaceutical plants that export to their countries and found many to be seriously non compliant with GMP.

There is only federal regulation on new drug application, but there are both local regulation and national regulation regarding pharma expenditures of hospitals, reimbursable drug lists, and other issues. National regulation is implemented by SFDA and other state agencies, while local regulation is implemented by provincial agencies.

Through related laws, China has established a physician licensing system, which requires physicians to pass a national exam to be eligible for applying for licenses. After passing the exam, physicians will be eligible for applying for certificates for the practice of medicine. Licensed physicians can open their own clinics five years after getting licenses, during which they must work as physicians.

There is a mechanism for approving new drugs (from NDA filing to approval). A full three-phase research trial takes three to five years, similar to the U.S., while requirements to start a trial are onerous by foreign standards, according to Western drug-company executives.

Although the approval time is being shortened, there still remain many aspects where transparency is lacking.

=== Patents ===
Western pharmaceutical companies have applied for numerous patents in China. About 10,000 patents for traditional Chinese medicines belong to Western companies. However, some Western observers say China lacks administrative protection for patents.

In 1992, the United States and China signed a memorandum of understanding (MOU) to allow administrative protection (AP) in China for US pharmaceutical patents granted between 1986 and 1992. The MOU provided seven-and-a-half years of market exclusivity, or AP rights, in China for pharma patents that were: not protected by exclusive rights before the amendment of current Chinese laws; patent protected after 1 January 1986 and before 1 January 1993 in an MOU signatory country; not previously marketed in China. Several Chinese government policies have prevented US industry from realizing the intended MOU benefits. According to Article 42 of the Patent Law, the duration of patent right for inventions is twenty years, and the duration for utility models and patent right for designs is ten years, counted from the date of filing.

The State Intellectual Property Office is responsible for enforcing patents. The intellectual property system in China was originated from and developed as a result of the policy of reform and opening-up. The State Council, the Patent Office of China, the predecessor of SIPO, was founded in 1980 to protect intellectual property, encourage invention and creation, help popularize inventions and their exploitation, and promote the progress and innovation in science and technology.

In 1998, with the restructuring of the government agencies, the Patent Office of China was renamed SIPO and became a government institution under the direct under control of the State Council. The office is in charge of patent affairs and deals with foreign-related intellectual property issues.

=== United States and China ===
As a member of the World Intellectual Property Organization, China is active in protecting international patents. The SIPO has signed intellectual property protection memorandums with countries including Russia and Thailand on the protection of intellectual properties. Such agreements are necessary to protect international patents in China.

On 14 July 2005, China and the United States reached an agreement on intellectual property protection. According to western pharmaceutical business journals, most discouraging to US pharmaceutical companies has been the rampant theft of their intellectual property through patent infringement and counterfeiting. All those factors undermined the competitive advantage that innovative pharmaceutical companies stood to gain from marketing investments. As a result, US companies accounted for less than 10 percent of China's total pharmaceutical imports between 1998 and 2000.

China has more recently agreed to implement the Trade Related Intellectual Property Agreement of the Uruguay Round. To comply, Chinese companies will have to change their long-time practice of relying on counterfeit products. According to China's Securities Times, foreign companies will be able to file compensation claims ranging from $400 million to $1 billion against companies that copy patented medicines.

=== Articles 18 and 19 ===
Chinese patent law addresses foreign companies in articles 18 and 19. Under Article 18, where any foreigner, foreign enterprise or other foreign organization having no habitual residence or business office in China files an application for a patent in China, the application is treated in accordance with any agreement between the organization's host country and China, or any international treaty to which both countries are party, or on the basis of the principle of reciprocity.

Under Article 19, where such an organization applies for a patent, or has other patent matters to attend to in China, it must appoint a patent agency designated by the patent administration department under the State Council to act as his or its agent.

The patent agency is mandated to comply with the laws and administrative regulations, and to handle patent applications and other patent matters according to the instructions of its clients. The agency bears the responsibility of keeping the contents of its clients' inventions-creations confidential. The administrative regulations governing the patent agency are formulated by the State Council.

== Distribution ==
The Chinese pharmaceutical distribution sector is very fragmented with about 10,000+ state-owned pharmaceutical wholesalers. Direct marketing to doctors (detailing), which is the basic marketing activity in developed countries, complemented by advertising, is not developed in China. Chinese hospitals generate 60 percent of their revenues from the sale of prescription drugs. Hospital pharmacies are still the main retail outlets for pharmaceuticals, accounting for 80 percent of total drug sales. This situation is changing because the government is encouraging the establishment of retail pharmacies that are not associated with hospitals.

Drugs are distributed in China through the Chinese-style channels. China has a three tiered distribution system. At the top of the ladder are national level-1 stations in Beijing, Shanghai, Shenyang, Guangzhou, and Tianjin. These allocate products to provincial level-2 distributors, who in turn sell to county and city level-3 wholesaler-drug stores. At the bottom of the distribution chain are China's vast numbers of small retail stores are difficult to reach individually.

== Pharmaceutical Logistics ==
At present, China's pharmaceutical logistics industry is featured as small-scale, scattered investment and fierce competition. China's pharmaceutical logistics industry is mainly composed of pharmaceutical manufacturers and pharmaceutical distributors. China has 16,500 wholesalers, 120,000 retailers and more than 6,300 producers. In terms of sales, China's top three companies: Sinopharm Group, Shanghai Pharmaceutical Co. and Jiuzhoutong Group Corp., are all shared less than 5% of the national market.

Since 2002, China's pharmaceutical logistics industry has been expanding constantly. A great amount of capital is being poured into the industry. In 2007, China had three pharmaceutical logistics centers put into operation, namely, Jiangsu Yabang Medicine Logistics Center, Quanzhou Medicine & Food Logistics Port and Chongqing Medicine Heping Logistics Center.

Large pharmaceutical logistics projects that initiated the construction in 2007 include the China-ASEAN (Tongji) Medicine Logistics Center invested by Guangxi Tongji Medicine Group with CNY145 million, the Nantong Suzhong Pharmaceutical Logistics Center with a total investment of CNY280 million, and the Chongqing Modern Medicine Logistics Center Project jointly invested by Shenzhen Neptunus Bioengineering Co., Jinguan Group and Chongqing Huabo Medicine Co.

Based on the statistics from the China Association of Pharmaceutical Commerce and China's Medicine and Healthcare Product Import and Export Association, in view of the features of China's pharmaceutical logistics industry, China demands urgently to create a group of large trans-region, trans-industry and trans-ownership Pharmaceutical logistics conglomerates through restructuring the industry and forming an alliance. As for the construction of logistics centers, it is better to build them jointly. In this way, it will help carry out management on the entire logistics operation to speed up the flow of drugs, improve circulation efficiency and reduce logistics cost.

== Future growth ==
In 2009, China was the world's second-largest prescription drug market, according to a report released by pharmaceutical market research firm IMS Health. Sales of prescription drugs in China will grow by US$40 billion through 2013, the report said. The value-added output of China's pharmaceutical industry increased 14.9% year on year in 2009, according to statistics released by the Ministry of Industry and Information Technology. In the first 11 months of last year, the medicine sector's combined net profit was RMB 89.6 billion, up 25.9% year on year. Growth in the period was only 16.2% in the period from January to August.

== Retail operations ==
Due to China's former planned economy system, hospitals are still the main distributors of pharmaceuticals. In 2003, only 15.1% of total drug expenditures were incurred at pharmacy stores.(Meng 2005) The Chinese government legalized foreign ownership of retail pharmacies in 2003. Corporations such as Alliance Boots have formed retail and distribution joint ventures in China, mainly focused on Guangdong province.

Many companies have said that the drug distribution system in China is inefficient and adds considerably to the retail costs of medicine. Also there have been complaints of unclear regulations, low profitability, complex licensing procedure, hospital bidding, and reimbursement schemes.

== Dietary supplements ==
The dietary supplements sub-sector has doubled from $3 billion in 1998 to a total sales volume of $6 billion in 2001. Experts estimate that the industry will reach $10 billion in annual sales by 2010, and will continue as consumers seek products with curative weight loss and other health enhancing effects. Over 3,000 domestic manufacturers of dietary supplements produce more than 4,000 different types of products. Domestic manufacturers fail to develop product branding and credibility and rely heavily on advertising to generate sales. As such, most domestic products, due to loss of credibility amongst consumers, tend to have short life cycles. High quality imported products only account for 10% of total sales. Companies say that complicated product registration, expensive and time-consuming certification requirements, and inexperienced and inefficient distributors are common obstacles.

== Education and research ==
There are many institutes of higher learning in China that are engaged in pharmaceutical research. (See Pharmaceutical higher institutions in China.)

== See also ==
- China Pharmaceutical Industry Association
- Pharmacy in China
- Medicine in China and Public health in China
- Pharmaceutical policy
- National pharmaceuticals policy
- Pharmaceutical marketing
- List of pharmaceutical companies
- Protein structure prediction
- Drug design
- Rational drug design
- Bioinformatics
- Cheminformatics
- Biomedical informatics
- Orphan drug
- Physiologically-based pharmacokinetic modelling
- Pharmaceuticals in India
- Generic drug
- New chemical entity (NCE)
- Quality assurance (QA)
- Quality control (QC)
- Pharmacovigilance
- State Food and Drug Administration
- General Administration of Quality Supervision, Inspection and Quarantine
