= Essential medicines =

WHO formulary

Share of health facilities with essential medicines

Essential medicines, as defined by the World Health Organization (WHO), are medicines that "satisfy the priority health care needs of the population". Essential medicines should be accessible to people at all times, in sufficient amounts, and be generally affordable. Since 1977, the WHO has published a model list of essential medicines, with the 2023 list for adult patients containing over 500 medicines. Since 2007, a separate list of medicines intended for child patients has been published. A new list was published in 2021, for both adults and children.

Several changes have been implemented since the 2021 edition, including that medication cost should not be grounds for exclusion criteria if it meets other selection criteria, and cost-effectiveness differences should be evaluated within therapeutic areas. The following year, antiretroviral agents, usually used in the treatment of HIV/AIDS, were included on the list of essential medicines.

The WHO distinguishes between "core list" and "complementary list" medications.

- The core list contains a list of minimum medicine needs for a basic health care system, listing the most efficacious, safe and cost-effective medicines for priority conditions. Priority conditions are selected on the basis of current and estimated future public health relevance, and potential for safe and cost-effective treatment.
- The complementary list lists essential medicines for priority diseases, for which specialized diagnostic or monitoring facilities are needed. In case of doubt, medicines may also be listed as complementary on the basis of higher costs or less attractive cost-effectiveness in a variety of settings.

This list forms the basis of the national drugs policy in more than 155 countries, both in the developed and developing world. Many governments refer to WHO recommendations when making decisions on health spending. Countries are encouraged to prepare their own lists considering local priorities. Over 150 countries have published an official essential medicines list. Despite these efforts, an estimated 2 billion people still lack access to essential medicines, with some of the major obstacles being low supply, including shortages of inexpensive drugs. Following these shortages, the US Food and Drug Administration (FDA) released a report in fall of 2019 with strategies to overcome and mitigate supply issues.

== Theory and practice ==
The original WHO definition in 1977 was that they were medicines "of utmost importance, basic, indispensable, and necessary for the healthcare needs of the population". The concept was mentioned in one of the ten points of the 1978 Alma Ata Declaration on primary health care.

In 2002 the definition was changed to:

Essential medicines are those that satisfy the priority health care needs of the population.

This remains the definition as of 2019.

The use of essential medicines lists has resulted in better quality of care and improved management of health resources in the most cost-effective manner. The lists serve as a baseline for health insurance entities to include or exclude the medication, and modify the dose based on clinical study evidence. To improve the accessibility of essential medicines for both children and adults, it is necessary to ensure the rational use of medicine while also being cost-effective.

In a 2023 study evaluating the availability, distribution, and progress of essential medicines in China, results showed that access to essential medicines is lower in comparison to the WHO's goal, with little progress in expansion over the years. This systematic review and meta-analysis study pooled studies that reported the availability of essential medicines in various regions of China from 2009 to 2019. The data supports the need to improve the access and distribution of medication across regions to ensure that the goal of universal health coverage is reached. Having essential medications be accessible to everyone is the foundation to a better health without financial hardships for the general public.

The goal of universal health coverage was set in place in 2015, where multiple countries have taken steps towards ensuring treatment, palliation, rehabilitation, and preventative health measures for everyone. Understanding that accessibility to appropriate and applicable essential medications within the region, is the first step towards reaching equitable and universal healthcare.

=== Selection ===
Items are chosen as essential medicines based on how common the disease that is being treated, evidence of benefit, the degree of side effects and the cost compared to other options. In order to explore the human rights law and WHO's essential medicines policies into national legislation regarding medicines, affordability and financing needs to be understood to enhance universal access to essential medicines. The intention of essential medicine lists is to provide appropriate use of treatment and not include medications that have been withdrawn from the market in other countries due to unfavorable benefit-to-harm balance. Despite many efforts from different countries, some individuals do not have their needs met and have to turn to an alternative plan called the judiciary in order to receive the medications required. The Judiciary also known as the "Judicialization of access to medicines," this involves technical, scientific, legal, and social aspects. Further research is needed to explore these aspects comprehensively.

=== Cost-to-benefit ratio ===
Medications can be priced differently, due to the fact that each medication can have many qualities and uses. Because various medicines have different costs, individual uses, and distinct advantages, it prompts the theory of cost effectiveness. Cost effectiveness is the subject of debate between producers (pharmaceutical companies) and purchasers of drugs (national health services). It is estimated that access to essential medicines could save 10 million people a year. Access to essential medicine is a cornerstone of effective healthcare systems and a fundamental component of global health initiatives aimed at improving quality of life, reducing health disparities, and fostering sustainable development. Proper access to essential medicine can lower the need for more expensive treatments or hospitalizations by managing conditions early and effectively.

== History ==
The WHO made the Model List of Essential Medicines in 1977 based on the idea that certain medicines are required more often than others and are often inaccessible to many different populations. As of 2018, 146 countries are using the Essential Medicines concept, which is also used to guide the reimbursement of medicines depending on the importance to public health, the efficacy, the safety, and the cost of the medicines. The goal of the Essential Medicine concept is that medicines that have the highest relevance in public health, meaning medicines that are used the most often, should be available equally to everyone in a population either for free or at a very affordable cost.

The WHO Model List of Essential Medicines has been updated every two years since 1977. The 23rd version was published in July 2023. Over that period, the number of medications has more than doubled, from the original 208 in 1977, to more than 500 in 2023. Medicines are then categorized as essential or non-essential based on their inclusion in each country's EML. results are then analyzed by WHO regions, World Bank income groups, wealth inequality, and therapeutic groups. The group for essential medicines availability was higher (61.5%) than non-essential medicines (27.3%). But in the public sector, the median availability was 40% for essential medicines, compared to 6.6% for non-essential medicines. Thus, overall, the availability of essential medicines in the public sector is still suboptimal, indicating challenges in achieving equitable access.

=== Children's list ===
The first edition of the "WHO Model List of Essential Medicines for Children", was published in 2007, while the 9th edition was published in 2023. It was created to make sure that the needs of children were systematically considered such as availability of proper formulations. While the EML (Essential Medicine List) is intended for the population as a whole, the EMLc (Essential Medicine List for Children) is intended for children up to 12 years old. The first edition contained 450 formulations of 200 different medications and the 2023 list contains 361 medications. The intention of creating an EML for children is to improve child survival and provide treatment options for mortality and morbidity causes.

WHO launched a "Make Medicines Child Size" (MMCS) campaign in 2007 with the purpose of creating appropriate regimens and formulations for children based on their weight and age. A 2021 study assessing the age-appropriateness of enteral formulations listed on the WHO Essential Medicine List for Children (EMLc) highlighted the dependence on factors such as dose adaptability, formulation flexibility, and the child's swallowing ability. Analysis of the EMLc between 2011 and 2019 revealed that most enteral medications were not age-appropriate for children under six years old, necessitating manipulation of the medicine prior to administration. This practice raises concerns regarding safety and efficacy. Consequently, the study emphasizes the urgent need for more comprehensive information and guidelines for selecting and developing age-appropriate essential enteral medicines for pediatric populations.

While the practice of maintaining separate lists for the general population and children under 12 years of age is beneficial in tailoring healthcare interventions, it inadvertently excludes adolescents from the latter category. This age-based cutoff may lead to an oversight of the unique healthcare needs of this demographic. It would be a good idea to create a list for adolescents as well. This is important as it allows healthcare providers to offer tailored care for each group. This differentiation ensures that treatments are appropriate for children's unique physiological needs.

=== Adult's list ===
The first EML was published in 1977 and was created as a tool to improve the accessibility and availability of medications for everyone. Multiple editions of EMLs and studies since then have been released, comparing the necessity, efficacy, safety, and of certain medications on the list. In addition, studies have been done comparing EMLs from multiple regions to ensure the appropriateness of dosing and safety of drug classes.

Medication like Codeine has a potential of drug abuse and was established as an essential medication, yet raised some ethical questions. With the lack of literature highlighting its safety, it was highly discouraged to place Codeine as an essential medication. Not to mention, it was further discouraged in 2011 when Codeine was removed from WHO essential medicine list for children, causing greater discussion of its use in adults. Another article discusses the appropriateness of empirical dosing of different antibiotics on EMLs from multiple countries. Using the top 31 priority bacterial infections as a comparator, results showed how broadening the antibiotic list and dose, would not only increase adherence to treating the infections. It would also address the antibiotic resistance complication in most bacterial infections. This 2021 Cross-Sectional study, reviewed the antibiotics on the essential medicines list from 138 countries and assessed each countries national listing. The data showed that on average of the 44 essential antibiotic medications, 24 of them were accessible to the population, 5 of them considered on reserve, and 15 of them on WATCH using the AWaRe classification.

Additionally, the use of therapeutic guidelines as a reference for the creation of the WHO Essential Medicine List has been used to provide consistency and alignment of treatment across the nation. In the 2022 quantitative analysis study of cardiovascular medications, the data suggests how adopting a common formulary of combination therapy and specific types of drug classes improved patient adherence and cardiovascular outcomes within the region. The study compared South Africa and 15 different South African Development Communities (SADC) essential medication lists of 2021 for cardiovascular medications. Having majority of SADC lists aligned with the WHO essential medicine lists of South Africa, supports how implementing this into the national EML would provide greater accessibility and availability of CVD medications consistently throughout the nation.

== Implementation ==
While the WHO Essential Medicine Lists are a very valuable tool and integral to the country's medicine policy, there has not yet been enough effort to implement them. There are several factors that affect the adaptation and implementation of the WHO Essential Medicine Lists, as found by a 2022 qualitative evidence synthesis. This study identified areas that need support in order to implement EML at a country level. The lack of effort to implement WHO Essential medicines lists undermines the potential health benefits, exacerbates inequities in access, increase health costs and infrastructure.

Implementation of the WHO EML can be done with national medication selection committees that are able to operate with consultive mandates. These committees also need very clear leadership, monitoring, and evaluations. Implementation of EMLs can be done efficiently if there is a form of a reimbursement process in order to help keep costs low. Additionally, EMLs should have recommended clinical practices, such as listing necessary items, in order to make implementation of the list easy to do. For example, in the case of injectable medications, the EML should indicate that in addition to the medication a patient would also need an injection device and safety box. Finally, there needs to be clear legislation and monitoring to make sure there is compliance.

In May 2026 the European Union agreed on a Critical Medicines Act. Member states agreed to stockpile medicines and invest in new production of key drugs to prevent shortages and ensure there is no repeat of the panic buying from overseas that occurred during the COVID-19 pandemic. The list of critical medicines includes more than 300 pharmaceuticals, including paracetamol, morphine and insulin. Any 5 or more EU members will be able to ask the European Commission to procure medicines collectively. Governments will be able to subsidise new factories to make ingredients or drugs.

== Society and culture ==
Access to essential medicines are part of the Sustainable Development Goals, specifically goal 3.8.

A number of organizations, which are global in scope, use the list to determine which medications they will supply. Rather than strictly following the list, many nations refer to the essential medicines list as a guide for developing their own laws and regulations based on their own requirements.

Ecuador, Ghana, The Philippines, South Africa, and Ukraine all include some mention of essential medicines or other health infrastructure that helps guide their economic policies on medicine pricing and benefit selection. Especially in middle income countries where out-of-pocket spending on medications is common, health equity measures and economic policy helps evaluate the affordability of medications as well as the effects of public health legislation.

Brazil had published their first EML called RENAME 13 years prior to the WHO's first essential medicines list. RENAME included medicines that focused on safety, efficacy, and availability of medications, as well as Brazil's health priority of their population. The WHO EML encouraged Brazil to separate medications based on therapeutic classes, leading to both lists having the same format, despite different medications listed. The addition of the WHO's 2009 children's EML inspired Brazil to consider their own RENAME pediatric list. But limitations have caused Brazil to wait for further pediatric drug evidence within the country before finalizing their own children-specific EML. Challenges such as high prices and poor availability have impacted how citizens are actually able to obtain their medications, despite healthcare being a constitutional right in the country.

China first published their own EML in 1982, with the current EML containing over 2,000 herbal, chemical, and biological medicines. The Ministry of Health (MOH) consists of medical and economic experts that are divided into a consult and review group to develop their national medicines list. Provinces in China are able to form their own EML, but are not allowed to remove medicines already listed in the national EML.

India first developed their National List of Essential Medicines (NLEM) back in 1996 with only a minimal amount of revisions. Evidence-based criteria is used to determine which medications to add or remove to the list. Clinicians, pharmacologists, pharmacists, etc. discuss and review the list where an open-house discussion is used to modify and finalize the NLEM. However, poor medical supplies and staff with low health investments in implementations have caused people to go to private hospitals and clinics for treatment. And with a large variety on rural and urban populations throughout the country, healthcare services and general access are favored more towards the urban population.

== See also ==
- Campaign for Access to Essential Medicines
- Universities Allied for Essential Medicines
- Department of Essential Drugs and Medicines
- List of World Health Organization Essential Medicines
- Basic needs
