= Joos Horsten =

Belgian businessman (1942–2008)

Joos Horsten (1942–2008) was a Belgian businessman. He founded Xian Janssen Pharmaceutical, the Sino-Belgian joint venture of Janssen Pharmaceutica, a Flemish pharmaceutical company in Belgium.

== Career ==
For almost 25 years, he was responsible for chemical manufacturing and international production at Janssen Pharmaceutica, and together with Chinese partners, he established Xian Janssen Pharmaceutical. After the opening of China in 1978, their first factory was set up by Joos Horsten in Hanzhong, after which a second and larger factory followed in Xi'an.

From 1992 to 1997, he continued his career at Solvay Pharmaceuticals, a Belgian chemical and pharmaceutical multinational, as Vice-President Technical Affairs, and in 1997 established his own company, as a consultant to Chinese pharmaceutical companies. His contacts led to other companies doing business in China: Xian Thiebaut Pharmaceutical Packaging Co, and Xian Flanders Innovation Services (XFIS).

In 2002, he became chairman for the soccer club K.V. Turnhout, restoring it to financial stability, renegotiating debts, from the construction of a new sports stadium.

On 21 June 2008, he died in China of an apparent heart attack. He left a wife and four sons.

== Awards ==
- "Friendship Award" following the 40th anniversary of the liberation of China, by then Prime Minister Li Peng on 1 October 1989.

== Works ==
- Geerdt Magiels, Joos Horsten (2004). Paul Janssen: pionier in farma en in China. Houtekiet. ISBN 90-5240-827-0.

== See also ==
- Paul Janssen
- Pharmaceutical industry in China

== Notes ==
- Geerdt Magiels, Paul Janssen. Pionier in farma en in China, Houtekiet, 2005.
