= Department of Essential Drugs and Medicines =

The mission of the Department of Essential Drugs and Medicines of the World Health Organization is "to help save lives and improve health by closing the huge gap between the potential that essential drugs have to offer and the reality that for millions of people – particularly the poor and disadvantaged – medicines are unavailable, unaffordable, unsafe or improperly used."

The EDM provides "global guidance on essential drugs and medicines, and working with countries – at their request – to implement national drug policies to ensure equity of access to essential drugs, drug quality and safety, and rational use of drugs."

== See also ==
- Campaign for Access to Essential Medicines
- Essential medicines
- WHO Model List of Essential Medicines
