= Universities Allied for Essential Medicines =

American student charitable organization

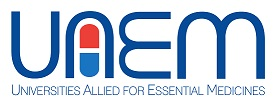
- Founded: 2001
- Location: Washington, DC
- Key people: Justin Mendoza, Executive Director, UAEM North America Anna Peiris, Executive Director, UAEM Europe
- Website: www.uaem.org

Universities Allied for Essential Medicines (UAEM) is a student-led organization working to improve access to and affordability of medicines around the world, and to increase research and development of drugs for neglected tropical diseases.

Supported by a board of directors and guided by an advisory board that includes Partners in Health co-founder Paul Farmer and Nobel Laureate Sir John Sulston, UAEM has mobilized hundreds of students on more than 100 campuses in more than 20 countries. These student advocates have convinced universities worldwide to adopt equitable global access licensing policies for licensing their medical research, in order to make life-saving health innovations affordable and accessible in low and middle income countries.

== Publications ==
UAEM has published two student-led research projects. The "University Report Card", which ranks universities on their contributions to global health, received coverage in The New York Times. Reports were released for universities in Canada, the United Kingdom, and the United States.

"Re:Route" maps of biomedical research and development (R&D) alternatives.

== Campaigns ==
The organization has worked globally on a campaign aimed at encouraging the World Health Organization to discuss an R&D agreement. In 2019, it began a two-year campaign targeting agencies providing public funding for biomedical research around the world under the name "Take Back Our Medicines" (TBOM).

In March 2020, UAEM launched the "Free the Vaccine for COVID-19" campaign in conjunction with the Center for Artistic Activism, with the primary goal to ensure that publicly-funded COVID-19 tests, treatments and vaccines would be sustainably priced, available to all and free at the point of delivery.

== Chapters ==
The basic units of the organizations are called chapters. A chapter is a self-organised group of students, primarily based at an academic institution often with faculty support. Chapters range in size, from more intimate groups of 2 or 3, to larger gatherings of around 30 or more students. UAEM chapters are present in the US, United Kingdom, Canada, Australia, Iran, India, Brazil, Sudan, Austria, Switzerland, Germany, Denmark, Italy and The Netherlands.

== See also ==
- Essential medicines
- Médecins Sans Frontières's Campaign for Access to Essential Medicines
- Patent
- Technology transfer
