= Campaign for Access to Essential Medicines =

Campaign started by Médecins Sans Frontières

The Campaign for Access to Essential Medicines is an international campaign started by Médecins Sans Frontières (MSF) to increase the availability of essential medicines in developing countries. MSF often has difficulties treating patients because the medicines required are too expensive or are no longer produced. Sometimes, the only drugs available are highly toxic or ineffective, and they often have to resort to inadequate testing methods to diagnose patients.

The lack of research into diseases that affect most of the world’s poor population is known as the 10-90 gap and it occurs because pharmaceutical companies rarely make a profit when developing drugs for these diseases. Although some countries have created legislation to encourage development of essential but commercially ignored medicines, which are called orphan drugs in the United States, MSF started this campaign in November 1999 to bring more awareness to the issue, using its prize money from its 1999 Nobel Peace Prize to fund the project.

MSF’s Campaign for Access to Essential Medicines is pushing to lower the prices of existing drugs, vaccines and diagnostic tests, to stimulate research and development into new treatments for diseases that primarily affect the poor, and to overcome other barriers that prevent patients getting the treatment they need.

The Campaign is made up of a team of medical, legal, policy and communications specialists working together to tackle these various issues.

== Conditions ==
The Campaign is calling for improvements to the quality of food aid to meet growing children’s nutritional needs. They are also urging a rapid scale-up in the use and production of Ready-to-Use Foods (RUF) to reduce childhood deaths from malnutrition.

It is campaigning for new TB drugs and simple diagnostics to be developed while continuing to call to attention the serious underfunding for TB research.

The Campaign continues to fight to ensure that patients have access to better and improved HIV treatments as well as further scaling up of treatment.

The Campaign supports the use of flexibilities in world trade rules and the creation of a patent pool to ensure that patents don’t get in the way of access to the medicines patients need.

== Research ==
The Campaign is working to promote alternative ways of steering and funding medical research to meet the medical needs of people in developing countries, rather than market priorities.

== Policy ==
MSF has supported policies that large drugmakers have resisted, in an effort to improve access to essential medicines.

The director of policy advocacy Michelle Childs of MSF said "An important precedent, not just for the people living with HIV within its country, who have been campaigning for this, but also for other developing countries. As medicines for HIV and hepatitis B are increasingly under patent in developing counties, Indonesia has shown that countries can and should take action to enable the production of low-cost versions of essential life-saving medicines for their citizens"

== Humanitarian Mechanism ==
In 2017, MSF, WHO, UNICEF, and Save The Children reached an agreement with Pfizer and GSK, called the Humanitarian Mechanism. This allows humanitarian groups and UN agencies to purchase pneumonia vaccines at a greatly reduced price. MSF continued to advocate for expansion of this mechanism to other vaccines and customers, and called for generic manufacturers to produce them and lower the market price.

== See also ==
- Essential medicines
  - WHO Model List of Essential Medicines
- World Health Organization
  - Department of Essential Drugs and Medicines
- Universities Allied for Essential Medicines
