= Evidence =

Material supporting an assertion

Evidence for a proposition is what supports the proposition. It is usually understood as an indication that the proposition is true. The exact definition and role of evidence vary across different fields.

In epistemology, evidence is what justifies beliefs or what makes it rational to hold a certain doxastic attitude. For example, a perceptual experience of a tree may serve as evidence to justify the belief that there is a tree. In this role, evidence is usually understood as a private mental state. In phenomenology, evidence is limited to intuitive knowledge, often associated with the controversial assumption that it provides indubitable access to truth.

In science, scientific evidence is information gained through the scientific method that confirms or disconfirms scientific hypotheses, acting as a neutral arbiter between competing theories. Measurements of Mercury's "anomalous" orbit, for example, are seen as evidence that confirms Einstein's theory of general relativity. The problems of underdetermination and theory-ladenness are two obstacles that threaten to undermine the role of scientific evidence. Philosophers of science tend to understand evidence not as mental states but as verifiable information, observable physical objects or events, secured by following the scientific method.

In law, evidence is information to establish or refute claims relevant to a case, such as testimony, documentary evidence, and physical evidence.

The relation between evidence and a supported statement can vary in strength, ranging from weak correlation to indisputable proof. Theories of the evidential relation examine the nature of this connection. Probabilistic approaches hold that something counts as evidence if it increases the probability of the supported statement. According to hypothetico-deductivism, evidence consists in observational consequences of a hypothesis. The positive-instance approach states that an observation sentence is evidence for a universal statement if the sentence describes a positive instance of this statement.

== Philosophy of evidence ==
=== Characteristics ===
Understood in its broadest sense, evidence for a proposition is what supports this proposition. (Note: Similarly, evidence against a proposition is what counts against it.) Traditionally, the term is sometimes understood in a narrower sense: as the intuitive knowledge of facts that are considered indubitable. In this sense, only the singular form is used. This meaning is found especially in phenomenology, in which evidence is elevated to one of the basic principles of philosophy, giving philosophy the ultimate justifications that are supposed to turn it into a rigorous science. In a more modern usage, the plural form is also used. In academic discourse, evidence plays a central role in epistemology and in the philosophy of science. Reference to evidence is made in many different fields, like in science, in the legal system, in history, in journalism and in everyday discourse. A variety of different attempts have been made to conceptualize the nature of evidence. These attempts often proceed by starting with intuitions from one field or in relation to one theoretical role played by evidence and go on to generalize these intuitions, leading to a universal definition of evidence.

One important intuition is that evidence is what justifies beliefs. This line of thought is usually followed in epistemology and tends to explain evidence in terms of private mental states, for example, as experiences, other beliefs or knowledge. This is closely related to the idea that how rational someone is, is determined by how they respond to evidence. Another intuition, which is more dominant in the philosophy of science, focuses on evidence as that which confirms scientific hypotheses and arbitrates between competing theories. On this view, it is essential that evidence is public so that different scientists can share the same evidence. This leaves publicly observable phenomena like physical objects and events as the best candidates for evidence, unlike private mental states. One problem with these approaches is that the resulting definitions of evidence, both within a field and between fields, vary a lot and are incompatible with each other. For example, it is not clear what a bloody knife and a perceptual experience have in common when both are treated as evidence in different disciplines. This suggests that there is no unitary concept corresponding to the different theoretical roles ascribed to evidence, i.e. that we do not always mean the same thing when we talk of evidence.

On the other hand, Aristotle, phenomenologists, and numerous scholars accept that there could be several degrees of evidence. For instance, while the outcome of a complex equation may become more or less evident to a mathematician after hours of deduction, yet with little doubts about it, a simpler formula would appear more evident to them.

Riofrio has detected some characteristics that are present in evident arguments and proofs. The more they are evident, the more these characteristics will be present. There are six intrinsic characteristics of evidence:

- The truth lies in what is evident, while falsehood or irrationality, although it may appear evident at times, lacks true evidence.
- What is evident aligns coherently with other truths acquired through knowledge. Any insurmountable incoherence would indicate the presence of error or falsehood.
- Evident truths are based on necessary reasoning.
- The simplest truths are the most evident. They are self-explanatory and do not require argumentation to be understood by the intellect. However, for those lacking education, certain complex truths require rational discourse to become evident.
- Evident truths do not need justification; they are indubitable. They are intuitively grasped by the intellect, without the need for further discourse, arguments, or proof.
- Evident truths are clear, translucent, and filled with light.

In addition, four subjective or external characteristics can be detected over those things that are more or less evident:

- The evident instills certainty and grants the knower a subjective sense of security, as they believe to have aligned with the truth
- Initially, evident truths are perceived as natural and effortless, as Aristotle highlighted. They are innately present within the intellect, fostering a peaceful and harmonious understanding.
- Consequently, evident truths appear to be widely shared, strongly connected to common sense, which comprises generally accepted beliefs.
- Evident truths are fertile ground: they provide a solid foundation for other branches of scientific knowledge to flourish.

These ten characteristics of what is evident allowed Riofrio to formulate a test of evidence to detect the level of certainty or evidence that one argument or proof could have.

=== Evidential relation ===
Philosophers in the 20th century started to investigate the "evidential relation", the relation between evidence and the proposition supported by it. The issue of the nature of the evidential relation concerns the question of what this relation has to be like in order for one thing to justify a belief or to confirm a hypothesis. Important theories in this field include the probabilistic approach, hypothetico-deductivism and the positive-instance approach.

Probabilistic approaches, also referred to as Bayesian confirmation theory, explain the evidential relation in terms of probabilities. They hold that all that is necessary is that the existence of the evidence increases the likelihood that the hypothesis is true. This can be expressed mathematically as $P(H \mid E) > P(H)$. In words: a piece of evidence (E) confirms a hypothesis (H) if the conditional probability of this hypothesis relative to the evidence is higher than the unconditional probability of the hypothesis by itself. Smoke (E), for example, is evidence that there is a fire (H), because the two usually occur together, which is why the likelihood of fire given that there is smoke is higher than the likelihood of fire by itself. On this view, evidence is akin to an indicator or a symptom of the truth of the hypothesis. Against this approach, it has been argued that it is too liberal because it allows accidental generalizations as evidence. Finding a nickel in one's pocket, for example, raises the probability of the hypothesis that "All the coins in my pockets are nickels". But, according to Alvin Goldman, it should not be considered evidence for this hypothesis since there is no lawful connection between this one nickel and the other coins in the pocket.

Hypothetico-deductivism is a non-probabilistic approach that characterizes the evidential relations in terms of deductive consequences of the hypothesis. According to this view, "evidence for a hypothesis is a true observational consequence of that hypothesis". One problem with the characterization so far is that hypotheses usually contain relatively little information and therefore have few if any deductive observational consequences. So the hypothesis by itself that there is a fire does not entail that smoke is observed. Instead, various auxiliary assumptions have to be included about the location of the smoke, the fire, the observer, the lighting conditions, the laws of chemistry, etc. In this way, the evidential relation becomes a three-place relation between evidence, hypothesis and auxiliary assumptions. This means that whether a thing is evidence for a hypothesis depends on the auxiliary assumptions one holds. This approach fits well with various scientific practices. For example, it is often the case that experimental scientists try to find evidence that would confirm or disconfirm a proposed theory. The hypothetico-deductive approach can be used to predict what should be observed in an experiment if the theory was true. It thereby explains the evidential relation between the experiment and the theory. One problem with this approach is that it cannot distinguish between relevant and certain irrelevant cases. So if smoke is evidence for the hypothesis "there is fire", then it is also evidence for conjunctions including this hypothesis, for example, "there is fire and Socrates was wise", despite the fact that Socrates's wisdom is irrelevant here.

According to the positive-instance approach, an observation sentence is evidence for a universal hypothesis if the sentence describes a positive instance of this hypothesis. For example, the observation that "this swan is white" is an instance of the universal hypothesis that "all swans are white". This approach can be given a precise formulation in first-order logic: a proposition is evidence for a hypothesis if it entails the "development of the hypothesis". Intuitively, the development of the hypothesis is what the hypothesis states if it was restricted to only the individuals mentioned in the evidence. In the case above, we have the hypothesis "$\forall x (swan(x) \rightarrow white(x))$" (all swans are white) which, when restricted to the domain "{a}", containing only the one individual mentioned in the evidence, entails the evidence, i.e. "$swan(a) \land white(a)$" (this swan is white). One important shortcoming of this approach is that it requires that the hypothesis and the evidence are formulated in the same vocabulary, i.e. use the same predicates, like "$swan$" or "$white$" above. But many scientific theories posit theoretical objects, like electrons or strings in physics, that are not directly observable and therefore cannot show up in the evidence as conceived here.

=== In specific fields ===
Important theorists of evidence include Bertrand Russell, Willard Van Orman Quine, the logical positivists, Timothy Williamson, Earl Conee and Richard Feldman. Russell, Quine and the logical positivists belong to the empiricist tradition and hold that evidence consists in sense data, stimulation of one's sensory receptors and observation statements, respectively. According to Williamson, all and only knowledge constitute evidence. Conee and Feldman hold that only one's current mental states should be considered evidence.

==== In epistemology ====
The guiding intuition within epistemology concerning the role of evidence is that it is what justifies beliefs. For example, Phoebe's auditory experience of the music justifies her belief that the speakers are on. Evidence has to be possessed by the believer in order to play this role. So Phoebe's own experiences can justify her own beliefs but not someone else's beliefs. Some philosophers hold that evidence possession is restricted to conscious mental states, for example, to sense data. This view has the implausible consequence that many of simple everyday-beliefs would be unjustified. The more common view is that all kinds of mental states, including stored beliefs that are currently unconscious, can act as evidence. It is sometimes argued that the possession of a mental state capable of justifying another is not sufficient for the justification to happen. The idea behind this line of thought is that justified belief has to be connected to or grounded in the mental state acting as its evidence. So Phoebe's belief that the speakers are on is not justified by her auditory experience if the belief is not based in this experience. This would be the case, for example, if Phoebe has both the experience and the belief but is unaware of the fact that the music is produced by the speakers.

It is sometimes held that only propositional mental states can play this role, a position known as "propositionalism". A mental state is propositional if it is an attitude directed at a propositional content. Such attitudes are usually expressed by verbs like "believe" together with a that-clause, as in "Robert believes that the corner shop sells milk". Such a view denies that sensory impressions can act as evidence. This is often held as an argument against this view since sensory impressions are commonly treated as evidence. Propositionalism is sometimes combined with the view that only attitudes to true propositions can count as evidence. On this view, the belief that the corner shop sells milk only constitutes evidence for the belief that the corner shop sells dairy products if the corner shop actually sells milk. Against this position, it has been argued that evidence can be misleading but still count as evidence.

This line of thought is often combined with the idea that evidence, propositional or otherwise, determines what it is rational for us to believe. But it can be rational to have a false belief. This is the case when we possess misleading evidence. For example, it was rational for Neo in the Matrix movie to believe that he was living in the 20th century because of all the evidence supporting his belief despite the fact that this evidence was misleading since it was part of a simulated reality. This account of evidence and rationality can also be extended to other doxastic attitudes, like disbelief and suspension of belief. So rationality does not just demand that we believe something if we have decisive evidence for it, it also demands that we disbelieve something if we have decisive evidence against it and that we suspend belief if we lack decisive evidence either way.

==== In phenomenology ====
The meaning of the term "evidence" in phenomenology shows many parallels to its epistemological usage, but it is understood in a narrower sense. Thus, evidence here specifically refers to intuitive knowledge, which is described as "self-given" (selbst-gegeben). This contrasts with empty intentions, in which one refers to states of affairs through a certain opinion, but without an intuitive presentation. This is why evidence is often associated with the controversial thesis that it constitutes an immediate access to truth. In this sense, the evidently given phenomenon guarantees its own truth and is therefore considered indubitable. Due to this special epistemological status of evidence, it is regarded in phenomenology as the basic principle of all philosophy. In this form, it represents the lowest foundation of knowledge, which consists of indubitable insights upon which all subsequent knowledge is built. This evidence-based method is meant to make it possible for philosophy to overcome many of the traditionally unresolved disagreements and thus become a rigorous science. This far-reaching claim of phenomenology, based on absolute certainty, is one of the focal points of criticism by its opponents. Thus, it has been argued that even knowledge based on self-evident intuition is fallible. This can be seen, for example, in the fact that even among phenomenologists, there is much disagreement about the basic structures of experience.

==== In philosophy of science ====
In the sciences, evidence is understood as what confirms or disconfirms scientific hypotheses. The term "confirmation" is sometimes used synonymously with that of "evidential support". Measurements of Mercury's "anomalous" orbit, for example, are seen as evidence that confirms Einstein's theory of general relativity. This is especially relevant for choosing between competing theories. So in the case above, evidence plays the role of neutral arbiter between Newton's and Einstein's theory of gravitation. This is only possible if scientific evidence is public and uncontroversial so that proponents of competing scientific theories agree on what evidence is available. These requirements suggest scientific evidence consists not of private mental states but of public physical objects or events.

It is often held that evidence is in some sense prior to the hypotheses it confirms. This was sometimes understood as temporal priority, i.e. that we come first to possess the evidence and later form the hypothesis through induction. But this temporal order is not always reflected in scientific practice, where experimental researchers may look for a specific piece of evidence in order to confirm or disconfirm a pre-existing hypothesis. Logical positivists, on the other hand, held that this priority is semantic in nature, i.e. that the meanings of the theoretical terms used in the hypothesis are determined by what would count as evidence for them. Counterexamples for this view come from the fact that our idea of what counts as evidence may change while the meanings of the corresponding theoretical terms remain constant. The most plausible view is that this priority is epistemic in nature, i.e. that our belief in a hypothesis is justified based on the evidence while the justification for the belief in the evidence does not depend on the hypothesis.

A central issue for the scientific conception of evidence is the problem of underdetermination, i.e. that the evidence available supports competing theories equally well. So, for example, evidence from our everyday life about how gravity works confirms Newton's and Einstein's theory of gravitation equally well and is therefore unable to establish consensus among scientists. But in such cases, it is often the gradual accumulation of evidence that eventually leads to an emerging consensus. This evidence-driven process towards consensus seems to be one hallmark of the sciences not shared by other fields.

Another problem for the conception of evidence in terms of confirmation of hypotheses is that what some scientists consider the evidence to be may already involve various theoretical assumptions not shared by other scientists. This phenomenon is known as theory-ladenness. Some cases of theory-ladenness are relatively uncontroversial, for example, that the numbers output by a measurement device need additional assumptions about how this device works and what was measured in order to count as meaningful evidence. Other putative cases are more controversial, for example, the idea that different people or cultures perceive the world through different, incommensurable conceptual schemes, leading them to very different impressions about what is the case and what evidence is available. Theory-ladenness threatens to impede the role of evidence as neutral arbiter since these additional assumptions may favor some theories over others. It could thereby also undermine a consensus to emerge since the different parties may be unable to agree even on what the evidence is. When understood in the widest sense, it is not controversial that some form of theory-ladenness exists. But it is questionable whether it constitutes a serious threat to scientific evidence when understood in this sense.

== Different types of evidence ==
=== In science (empirical evidence) ===
In scientific research evidence is accumulated through observations of phenomena that occur in the natural world, or which are created as experiments in a laboratory or other controlled conditions. Scientists tend to focus on how the data used during statistical inference are generated. Scientific evidence usually goes towards supporting or rejecting a hypothesis.

The burden of proof is on the person making a contentious claim. Within science, this translates to the burden resting on presenters of a paper, in which the presenters argue for their specific findings. This paper is placed before a panel of judges where the presenter must defend the thesis against all challenges.

When evidence is contradictory to predicted expectations, the evidence and the ways of making it are often closely scrutinized (see experimenter's regress) and only at the end of this process is the hypothesis rejected: this can be referred to as 'refutation of the hypothesis'. The rules for evidence used by science are collected systematically in an attempt to avoid the bias inherent to anecdotal evidence.

=== In law ===
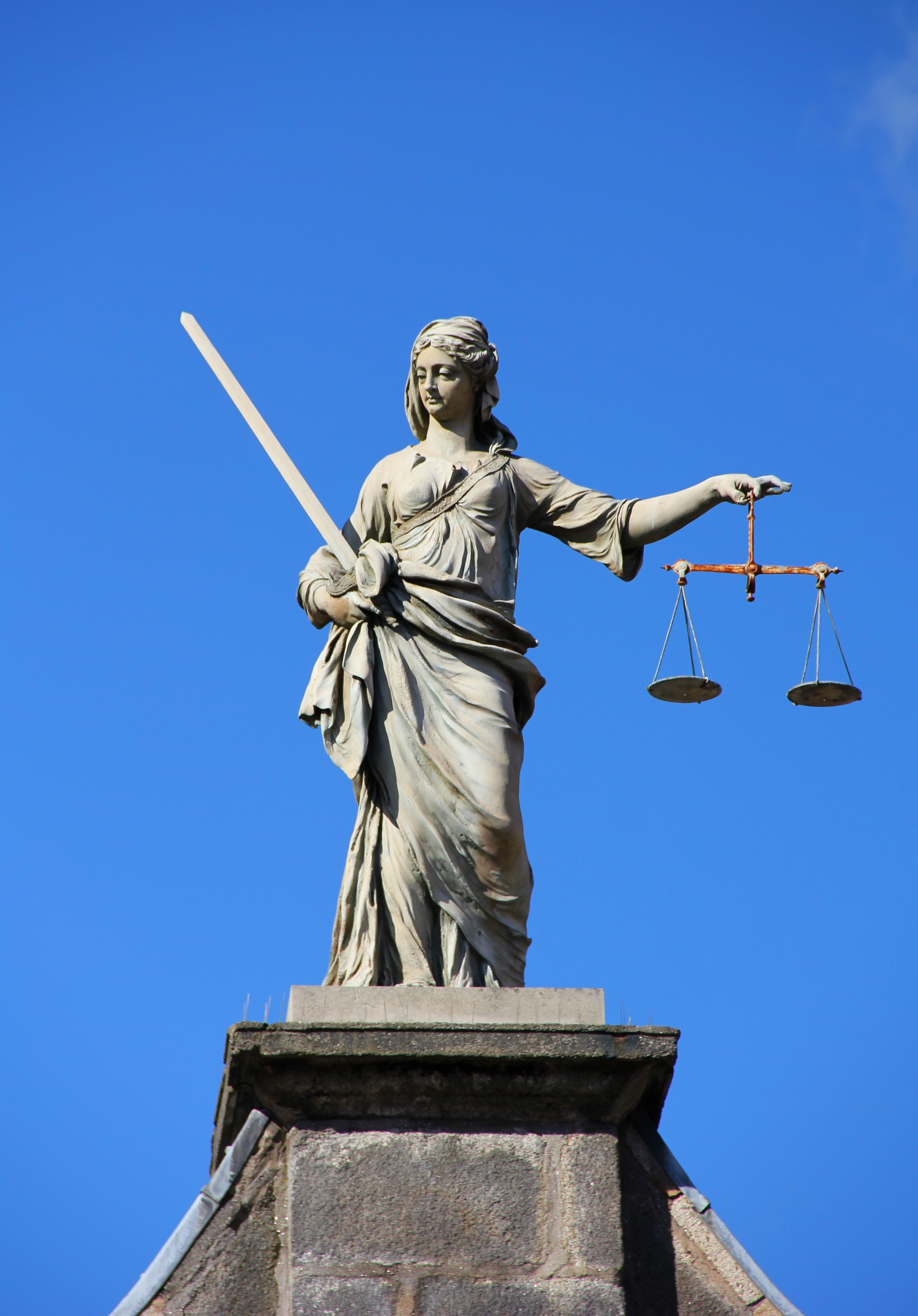
The balance scales seen in depictions of Lady Justice can be seen as representing the weighing of evidence in a legal proceeding.

In law, the production and presentation of evidence depend first on establishing on whom the burden of proof lies. Admissible evidence is that which a court receives and considers for the purposes of deciding a particular case and it includes both direct evidence as well as circumstantial evidence. Two primary burden-of-proof considerations exist in law. The first is on whom the burden rests. In many, especially Western, courts, the burden of proof is placed on the prosecution in criminal cases and the plaintiff in civil cases. The second consideration is the degree of certitude proof must reach, depending on both the quantity and quality of evidence. These degrees are different for criminal and civil cases, the former requiring evidence beyond a reasonable doubt, the latter considering only which side has the preponderance of evidence, or whether the proposition is more likely true or false.

The parts of a legal case that are not in controversy are known, in general, as the "facts of the case." Beyond any facts that are undisputed, a judge or jury is usually tasked with being a trier of fact for the other issues of a case. Evidence and rules are used to decide questions of fact that are disputed, some of which may be determined by the legal burden of proof relevant to the case. Evidence in certain cases (e.g. capital crimes) must be more compelling than in other situations (e.g. minor civil disputes), which drastically affects the quality and quantity of evidence necessary to decide a case. The decision-maker, often a jury, but sometimes a judge decides whether the burden of proof has been fulfilled. After deciding who will carry the burden of proof, the evidence is first gathered and then presented before the court:

==== Collection ====
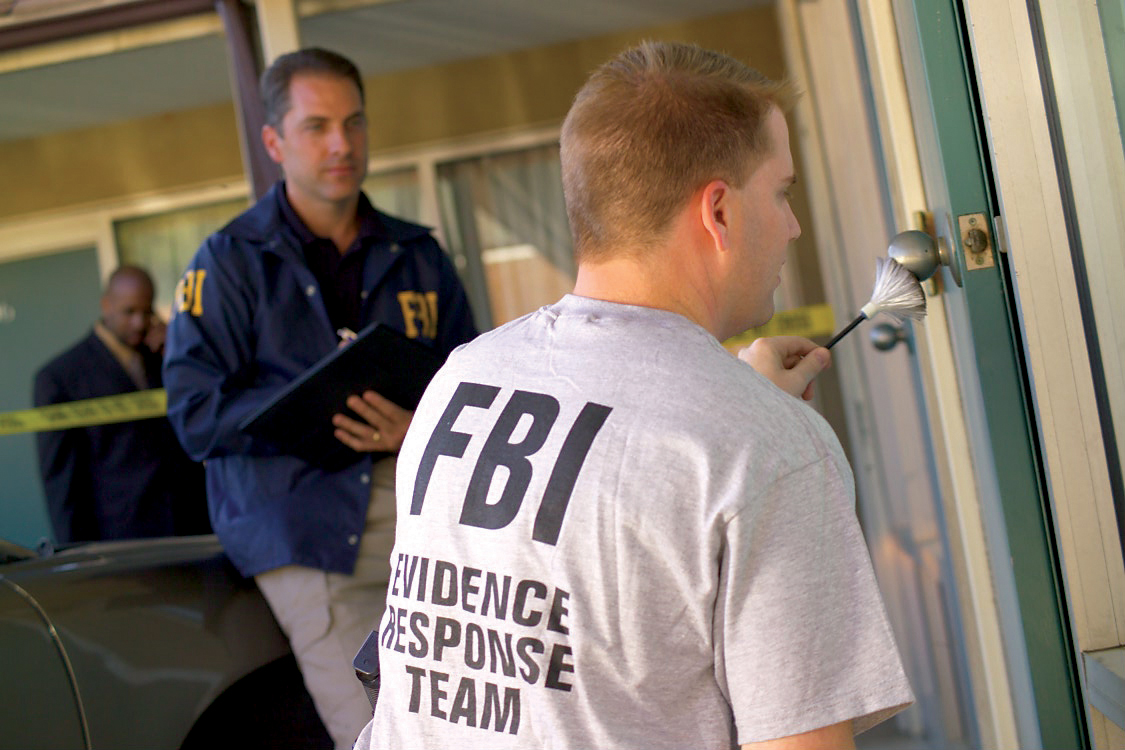
An FBI Evidence Response Team gathering evidence by dusting an area for fingerprints

In a criminal investigation, rather than attempting to prove an abstract or hypothetical point, the evidence gatherers attempt to determine who is responsible for a criminal act. The focus of criminal evidence is to connect physical evidence and reports of witnesses to a specific person.

==== Presentation ====
The path that physical evidence takes from the scene of a crime or the arrest of a suspect to the courtroom is called the chain of custody. In a criminal case, this path must be clearly documented or attested to by those who handled the evidence. If the chain of evidence is broken, a defendant may be able to persuade the judge to declare the evidence inadmissible.

Presenting evidence before the court differs from the gathering of evidence in important ways. Gathering evidence may take many forms; presenting evidence that tends to prove or disprove the point at issue is strictly governed by rules. Failure to follow these rules leads to any number of consequences. In law, certain policies allow (or require) evidence to be excluded from consideration based either on indicia relating to reliability, or broader social concerns. Testimony (which tells) and exhibits (which show) are the two main categories of evidence presented at a trial or hearing. In the United States, evidence in federal court is admitted or excluded under the Federal Rules of Evidence.

==== Burden of proof ====
The burden of proof is the obligation of a party in an argument or dispute to provide sufficient evidence to shift the other party's or a third party's belief from their initial position. The burden of proof must be fulfilled by both establishing confirming evidence and negating oppositional evidence. Conclusions drawn from evidence may be subject to criticism based on a perceived failure to fulfill the burden of proof.

Two principal considerations are:

1. On whom does the burden of proof rest?
2. To what degree of certitude must the assertion be supported?

The latter question depends on the nature of the point under contention and determines the quantity and quality of evidence required to meet the burden of proof.

In a criminal trial in the United States, for example, the prosecution carries the burden of proof since the defendant is presumed innocent until proven guilty beyond a reasonable doubt. Similarly, in most civil procedures, the plaintiff carries the burden of proof and must convince a judge or jury that the preponderance of the evidence is on their side. Other legal standards of proof include "reasonable suspicion", "probable cause" (as for arrest), "prima facie evidence", "credible evidence", "substantial evidence", and "clear and convincing evidence".

In a philosophical debate, there is an implicit burden of proof on the party asserting a claim, since the default position is generally one of neutrality or unbelief. Each party in a debate will therefore carry the burden of proof for any assertion they make in the argument, although some assertions may be granted by the other party without further evidence. If the debate is set up as a resolution to be supported by one side and refuted by another, the overall burden of proof is on the side supporting the resolution.

==== Specific types ====
- Digital evidence
- Physical evidence
- Relationship evidence
- Testimonial evidence
- Trace evidence

== See also ==
- Argument
- Belief
- Best practice
- Empiricism
- Evidence packaging
- Evidence-based assessment
- Evidence-based conservation
- Evidence-based dentistry
- Evidence-based design
- Evidence-based education
- Evidence-based legislation
- Evidence-based library and information practice
- Evidence-based management
- Evidence-based medical ethics
- Evidence-based medicine
- Evidence-based nursing
- Evidence-based pharmacy in developing countries
- Evidence-based policing
- Evidence-based policy
- Evidence-based practice
- Evidence-based prosecution
- Evidence-based toxicology
- Falsifiability
- Hierarchy of evidence
- Logical positivism
- Mathematical proof
- National Registry of Evidence-Based Programs and Practices
- Policy-based evidence making
- Proof (truth)
- Reason
- Skepticism
- Theory of justification
- Validity (logic)
