= Nature conservation =

Movement to protect the biosphere

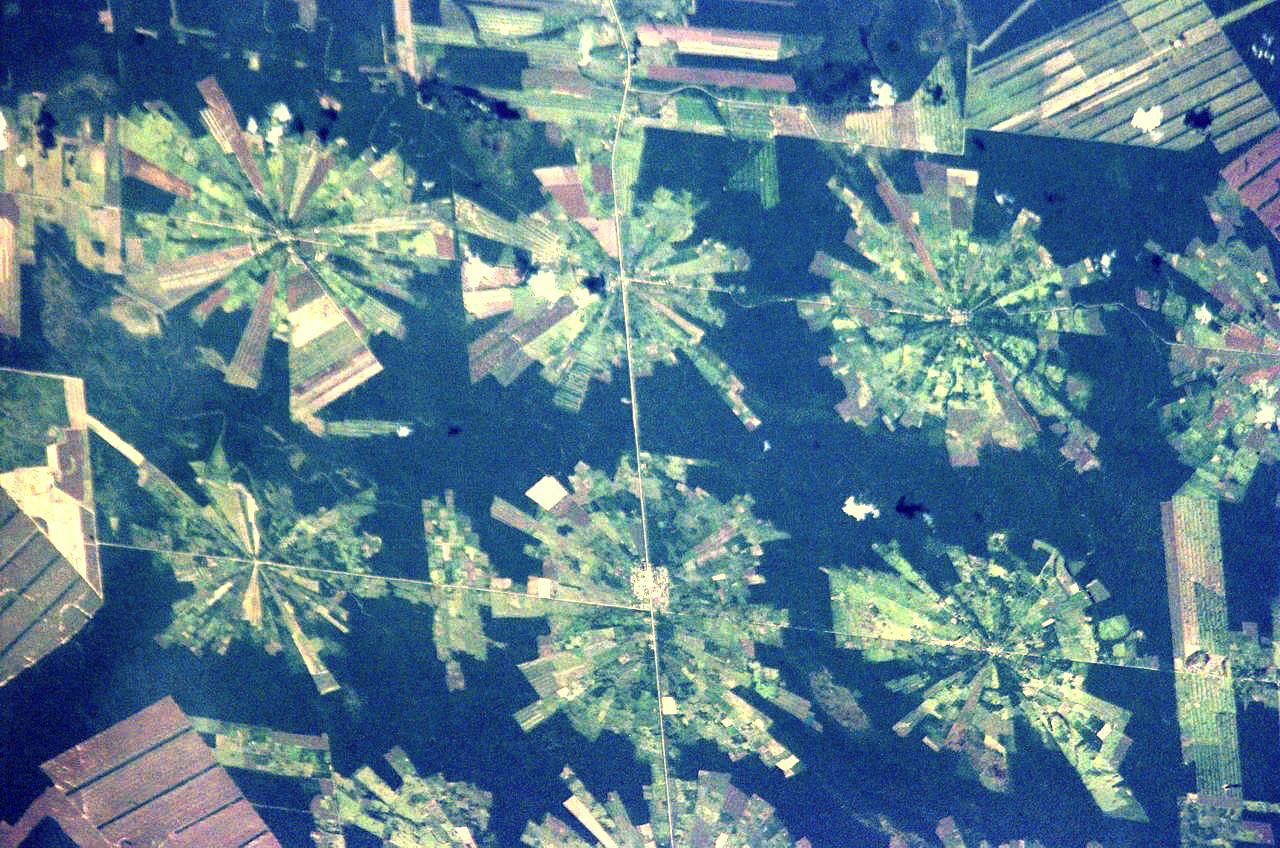
Satellite photograph of industrial deforestation in the Tierras Bajas project in eastern Bolivia, using skyline logging and replacement of forests by agriculture

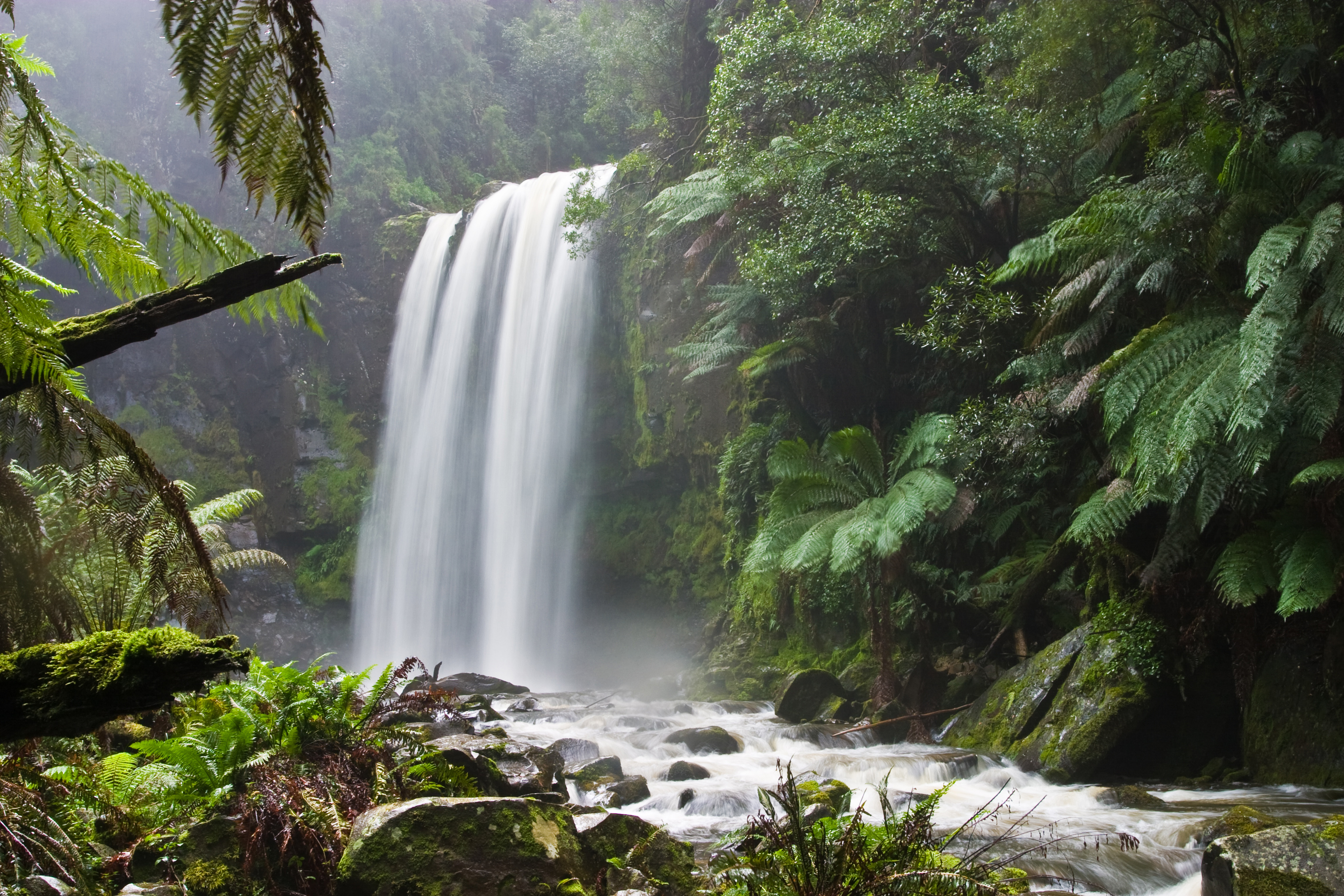
Much attention has been given to preserving the natural characteristics of Hopetoun Falls, Australia, while allowing access for visitors

Nature conservation is the ethical/moral philosophy and conservation movement focused on protecting species from extinction, maintaining and restoring habitats, enhancing ecosystem services, and protecting biological diversity. A range of values underlie conservation, which can be guided by biocentrism, anthropocentrism, ecocentrism, and sentientism, environmental ideologies that inform ecocultural practices and identities. There has recently been a movement towards evidence-based conservation which calls for greater use of scientific evidence to improve the effectiveness of conservation efforts. As of 2018 15% of land and 7.3% of the oceans were protected. Many environmentalists set a target of protecting 30% of land and marine territory by 2030. In 2021, 16.64% of land and 7.9% of the oceans were protected. The 2022 IPCC report on climate impacts and adaptation, underlines the need to conserve 30% to 50% of the Earth's land, freshwater and ocean areas – echoing the 30% goal of the U.N.'s Convention on Biodiversity. Protecting nature is important for keeping ecosystems stable and resilient. Diverse ecosystems offer vital services that help people and support a healthy environment.

== Introduction ==
Conservation goals include conserving habitat, preventing deforestation, maintaining soil organic matter, halting species extinction, reducing overfishing, and mitigating climate change. Different philosophical outlooks guide conservationists towards these different goals.

The principal value underlying many expressions of the conservation ethic is that the natural world has intrinsic and intangible worth along with utilitarian value – a view carried forward by parts of the scientific conservation movement and some of the older Romantic schools of the ecology movement. Philosophers have attached intrinsic value to different aspects of nature, whether this is individual organisms (biocentrism) or ecological wholes such as species or ecosystems (ecoholism).

More utilitarian schools of conservation have an anthropocentric outlook and seek a proper valuation of local and global impacts of human activity upon nature in their effect upon human wellbeing, now and to posterity. How such values are assessed and exchanged among people determines the social, political and personal restraints and imperatives by which conservation is practiced. This is a view common in the modern environmental movement. There is increasing interest in extending the responsibility for human wellbeing to include the welfare of sentient animals. In 2022 the United Kingdom introduced the Animal Welfare (Sentience) Act which lists all vertebrates, decapod crustaceans and cephalopods as sentient beings. Branches of conservation ethics focusing on sentient individuals include ecofeminism and compassionate conservation.

In the United States of America, the year 1864 saw the publication of two books which laid the foundation for Romantic and Utilitarian conservation traditions in America. The posthumous publication of Henry David Thoreau's Walden established the grandeur of unspoiled nature as a citadel to nourish the spirit of man. A very different book from George Perkins Marsh, Man and Nature, later subtitled "The Earth as Modified by Human Action", catalogued his observations of man exhausting and altering the land from which his sustenance derives. National Parks are important in the history of nature conservation, and some of the first parks were established in the USA. The historian Al Runte described how they first were set up and emphasized the role of "worthless lands", i.e. that mainly land of low commercial interest is protected, such as alpine and dry habitats. In addition, tourism, aesthetics, and "monumentalism" are important, according to Al Runte.

The consumer conservation ethic has been defined as the attitudes and behaviors held and engaged in by individuals and families that ultimately serve to reduce overall societal consumption of energy. The conservation movement has emerged from the advancements of moral reasoning. Increasing numbers of philosophers and scientists have made its maturation possible by considering the relationships between human beings and organisms with the same rigor. This social ethic primarily relates to local purchasing, moral purchasing, the sustained, and efficient use of renewable resources, the moderation of destructive use of finite resources, and the prevention of harm to common resources such as air and water quality, the natural functions of a living earth, and cultural values in a built environment. These practices are used to slow down the accelerating rate in which extinction is occurring at. The origins of this ethic can be traced back to many different philosophical and religious beliefs; that is, these practices has been advocated for centuries. In the past, conservationism has been categorized under a spectrum of views, including anthropocentric, utilitarian conservationism, and radical eco-centric green eco-political views.

More recently, the three major movements has been grouped to become what we now know as conservation ethic. The person credited with formulating the conservation ethic in the United States is former president, Theodore Roosevelt.

== Terminology ==
The conservation of natural resources is the fundamental problem. Unless we solve that problem, it will avail us little to solve all others.

— Theodore Roosevelt

The term "conservation" was coined by Gifford Pinchot in 1907. He told his close friend United States President Theodore Roosevelt who used it for a national conference of governors in 1908.

In common usage, the term refers to the activity of systematically protecting natural resources such as forests, including biological diversity. Carl F. Jordan defines biological conservation as:

a philosophy of managing the environment in a manner that does not despoil, exhaust or extinguish.

While this usage is not new, the idea of biological conservation has been applied to the principles of ecology, biogeography, anthropology, economy, and sociology to maintain biodiversity.

The term "conservation" itself may cover the concepts such as cultural diversity, genetic diversity, and the concept of movements environmental conservation, seedbank curation (preservation of seeds), and gene bank coordination (preservation of animals' genetic material). These are often summarized as the priority to respect diversity.

Much recent movement in conservation can be considered a resistance to commercialism and globalization. Slow Food is a consequence of rejecting these as moral priorities, and embracing a slower and more locally focused lifestyle.

Sustainable living is a lifestyle that people are beginning to adopt, promoting to make decisions that would help protect biodiversity. The small lifestyle changes that promote sustainability will eventually accumulate into the proliferation of biological diversity. Regulating the ecolabeling of products from fisheries, controlling for sustainable food production, or keeping the lights off during the day are some examples of sustainable living. However, sustainable living is not a simple and uncomplicated approach. A 1987 Brundtland Report expounds on the notion of sustainability as a process of change that looks different for everyone: "It is not a fixed state of harmony, but rather a process of change in which the exploitation of resources, the direction of investments, the orientation of technological development, and institutional change are made consistent with future as well as present needs. We do not pretend that the process is easy or straightforward." Simply put, sustainable living does make a difference by compiling many individual actions that encourage the protection of biological diversity.

== Practice ==
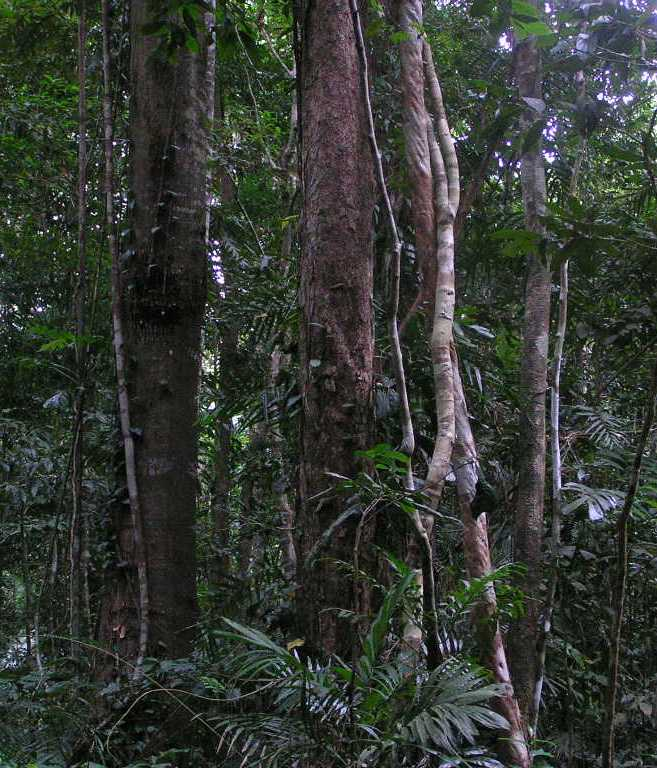
Daintree Rainforest in Queensland, Australia

Distinct trends exist regarding conservation development. The need for conserving land has only recently intensified during what some scholars refer to as the Capitalocene epoch. This era marks the beginning of colonialism, globalization, and the Industrial Revolution that has led to global land change as well as climate change.

While many countries' efforts to preserve species and their habitats have been government-led, those in the North Western Europe tended to arise out of the middle-class and aristocratic interest in natural history, expressed at the level of the individual and the national, regional or local learned society. Thus countries like Britain, the Netherlands, Germany, etc. had what would be called non-governmental organizations – in the shape of the Royal Society for the Protection of Birds, National Trust and County Naturalists' Trusts (dating back to 1889, 1895, and 1912 respectively) Natuurmonumenten, Provincial Conservation Trusts for each Dutch province, Vogelbescherming, etc. – a long time before there were national parks and national nature reserves. This in part reflects the absence of wilderness areas in heavily cultivated Europe, as well as a longstanding interest in laissez-faire government in some countries, like the UK, leaving it as no coincidence that John Muir, the Scottish-born founder of the National Park movement (and hence of government-sponsored conservation) did his sterling work in the US, where he was the motor force behind the establishment of such national parks as Yosemite and Yellowstone. Nowadays, officially more than 10 percent of the world is legally protected in some way or the other, and in practice, private fundraising is insufficient to pay for the effective management of so much land with protective status.

Protected areas in developing countries, where probably as many as 70–80 percent of the species of the world live, still enjoy very little effective management and protection. Some countries, such as Mexico, have non-profit civil organizations and landowners dedicated to protecting vast private property, such is the case of Hacienda Chichen's Maya Jungle Reserve and Bird Refuge in Chichen Itza, Yucatán. The Adopt A Ranger Foundation has calculated that worldwide about 140,000 rangers are needed for the protected areas in developing and transition countries. There are no data on how many rangers are employed at the moment, but probably less than half the protected areas in developing and transition countries have any rangers at all and those that have them are at least 50% short. This means that there would be a worldwide ranger deficit of 105,000 rangers in the developing and transition countries.

The terms conservation and preservation are frequently conflated outside the academic, scientific, and professional kinds of literature. The United States' National Park Service offers the following explanation for the important ways in which these two terms represent very different conceptions of environmental protection ethics:

Conservation and preservation are closely linked and may indeed seem to mean the same thing. Both terms involve a degree of protection, but how that protection is carried out is the key difference. Conservation is generally associated with the protection of natural resources, while preservation is associated with the protection of buildings, objects, and landscapes. Put simply, conservation seeks the proper use of nature, while preservation seeks protection of nature from use.

— United States National Park Service

During the environmental movement of the early 20th century, two opposing factions emerged: conservationists and preservationists. Conservationists sought to regulate human use while preservationists sought to eliminate human impact altogether."

C. Anne Claus presents a distinction for conservation practices. Claus divides conservation into conservation-far and conservation-near. Conservation-far is the means of protecting nature by separating it and safeguarding it from humans. Means of doing this include the creation of preserves or national parks. They are meant to keep the flora and fauna away from human influence and have become a staple method in the west. Conservation-near however is conservation via connection. The method of reconnecting people to nature through traditions and beliefs to foster a desire to protect nature. The basis is that instead of forcing compliance to separate from nature onto the people, instead conservationists work with locals and their traditions to find conservation efforts that work for all.

=== Evidence-based conservation ===
Evidence-based conservation is the application of evidence in conservation management actions and policy making. It is defined as systematically assessing scientific information from published, peer-reviewed publications and texts, practitioners' experiences, independent expert assessment, and local and indigenous knowledge on a specific conservation topic. This includes assessing the current effectiveness of different management interventions, threats and emerging problems, and economic factors.

Evidence-based conservation was organized based on the observations that decision making in conservation was based on intuition and/or practitioner experience often disregarding other forms of evidence of successes and failures (e.g. scientific information). This has led to costly and poor outcomes. Evidence-based conservation provides access to information that will support decision making through an evidence-based framework of "what works" in conservation.

The evidence-based approach to conservation is based on evidence-based practice which started in medicine and later spread to nursing, education, psychology, and other fields. It is part of the larger movement towards evidence-based practices.

== See also ==
- Conservation biology – Study of threats to biological diversity
- Conservation community – Controlled-growth land use development
- Cryoconservation of animal genetic resources – Animal gene preservation at very low temperatures
- Dark green environmentalism – Stance favoring the convergence of technological change with environmentalism
- Environmental history of the United States
- Environmental protection – Practice of protecting the natural environment
- Forest conservation – Branch of forestry
- Geoconservation – Conservation practice
- Index of environmental articles
- List of environmental issues
- List of environmental organizations
- Natural capital – World's stock of natural resources
- Natural environment – Living and non-living things on Earth
- Natural resource – Resources that exist without actions of humankind
- Relationship between animal ethics and environmental ethics – Ethical debate concerning animals and ecosystems
- Sustainable agriculture – Farming approach
- Trail ethics – Socially acceptable behaviors on recreational trails
- Water conservation – Policies for sustainable development of water use
- Wildlife conservation – Human Practice of protecting wild plant and animal species and their habitats
- 30 by 30 – International ecological preservation initiative
- Artificialization – Geology phenomenon
