= Evidence-based management =

Decisions and practices that use evidence to make decisions

Evidence-based management (EBMgt) is an emerging movement to explicitly use the current, best evidence in management and decision-making. It is part of the larger movement towards evidence-based practices.

== Overview ==
Evidence-based management entails managerial decisions and organizational practices informed by the best available evidence. As with other evidence-based practice, this is based on the three following principles:

- 1) published peer-reviewed (often in management or social science journals) research evidence that bears on whether and why a particular management practice works;
- 2) judgement and experience from contextual management practice, to understand the organization and interpersonal dynamics in a situation and determine the risks and benefits of available actions;
- 3) the preferences and values of those affected.

While, like its counterparts in medicine, and education EBMgt considers the circumstances and ethical concerns managerial decisions involve, it tends not to make extensive use of behavioral science relevant to effective management practice. Evidence-based management proceeds from the premise that using better, deeper logic and employing facts to the extent possible permits leaders to do their jobs better.

== Practice ==
An important part of EBMgt is educating current and future managers in evidence-based practices. The EBMgt website maintained at Stanford University provides a repository of syllabi, cases, and tools that can inform the teaching of evidence-based management.

Efforts to promote EBMgt face greater challenges than other evidence-based initiatives. In medicine, there is more consensus as to what constitutes best evidence than in the social sciences more generally, and management in particular. Unlike medicine, nursing, education, and law enforcement, "management", alone, is not a regulated profession. Management, however, is a learned discipline applied in practice in all types of professions, and professional disciplines essentially require professional management knowledge. There are no established legal or cultural requirements regarding education or knowledge for an individual to become a manager. Nevertheless, there are professional management organizations that do provide well-vetted and generally accepted professional certifications for managers who have been found knowledgeable, experienced, and tested through management certification examinations. Managers have diverse disciplinary backgrounds. An undergraduate college degree is typically required to enter MBA programs – but not to be a manager. No "regulated" body of shared knowledge characterizes managers, making it unlikely that peer pressure will be exerted to promote the use of evidence by any manager who refuses to do so. Little shared language or terminology exists, making it difficult for managers to hold discussions of evidence or evidence-based practices. For this reason, the adoption of evidence-based practices is likely to be organization-specific, where leaders take the initiative to build an evidence-based culture. Organizations successfully pursuing evidence-based management typically go through cycles of experimentation and redesign of their practices to create an evidence-based culture consistent with their values and mission.

Practices indicative of an evidence-based organizational culture include:

- systematic accumulation and analysis of organizational data;
- problem-based reading and discussion of research summaries; and,
- making decisions informed by best available research and organizational information.

Organizations adopting agile approaches in their product development, often find they need to make changes in other areas to reap the full benefits of the changes (the growing field of business agility and agile transformation). Evidence-based management provides a more structured approach to working through such change in short-cycles; to focus investments in areas that will bring the greatest value soonest; and to provide a framework for evaluating their success.

Some advocates of EBMgt argue that it is more likely to be adopted in knowledge-intensive organizations. A study of six leading healthcare organizations found that managers and clinical leaders used a variety of forms of knowledge including drawing on academic research, experiential knowledge and respected colleagues. The researchers concluded that skillful 'knowledge leadership' is crucial in translating EBMgt and other academic research into practice in ways that are relevant and can be mobilized in specific organizational contexts.

== Alternatives and objections ==
The weak form alternatives to evidence-based anything include hearsay, opinion, rhetoric, discourse, advice (opinion), self deception, bias, belief, fallacy, or advocacy. The stronger forms include concerns about what counts as evidence, types of evidence, what evidence is available, sought or possible, who decides and pays for what evidence to be collected, and that evidence needs to be interpreted. Also there are the limitations to empiricism as well argued in the historical debate between empiricism and rationalism which is usually assumed to be resolved by Immanuel Kant by saying the two are inextricably interwoven. We reason what evidence is fair and what the evidence means (Critique of Practical Reason). Critical theorists have raised objections to the claims made by those promoting evidence-based management. From this perspective, what counts as "evidence" is considered as intrinsically problematic and contested because there are different ways of looking at social problems. Furthermore, in line with perspectives from critical management studies, "management" is not necessarily an automatic good thing—it often involves the exercise of power and the exploitation of others. One response is to include a balanced treatment of such issues in reviewing and interpreting the research literature for practice. Another response is to reconsider EBMgt in terms of cybernetic theory, whereby the "requisite variety" of evidence compiled across decision-makers is critical because "compiling more evidence does not necessarily imply compiling a wider range of knowledge types" To that end, a promising alternative to the "evidence-based" approach would be the use of dialectic, argument, or public debate (argument is not to be confused with advocacy or quarreling). Aristotle, in works like Rhetoric, reasons that the way to test knowledge claims is to set up an inquiry method where a sceptical audience is encouraged to question evidence and its assumptions. To win an argument, convincing evidence is required. Calls for argumentative inquiry, or the argumentative turn may be fairer, safer and more creative than calls for evidence-based approaches.

== Supporting research ==
Some of the publications in this area are Evidence-Based Management, Harvard Business Review, and Hard Facts, Dangerous Half-Truths and Total Nonsense: Profiting From Evidence-Based Management. Some of the people conducting research on the effects of evidence-based management are Jeffrey Pfeffer, Robert I. Sutton, and Tracy Allison Altman. Pfeffer and Sutton also have a website dedicated to EBMgt.

Evidence-based management is also being applied in specific industries and professions, including software development. Other areas are crime prevention (Sherman et al. (2002), public management, and manufacturing.

== See also ==
- Argumentation theory
- Evidence-based policy
- Evidence-based practices
- Outline of management
- Test and Learn
