= Toxicology =

Academic area of substances harmful to living organisms

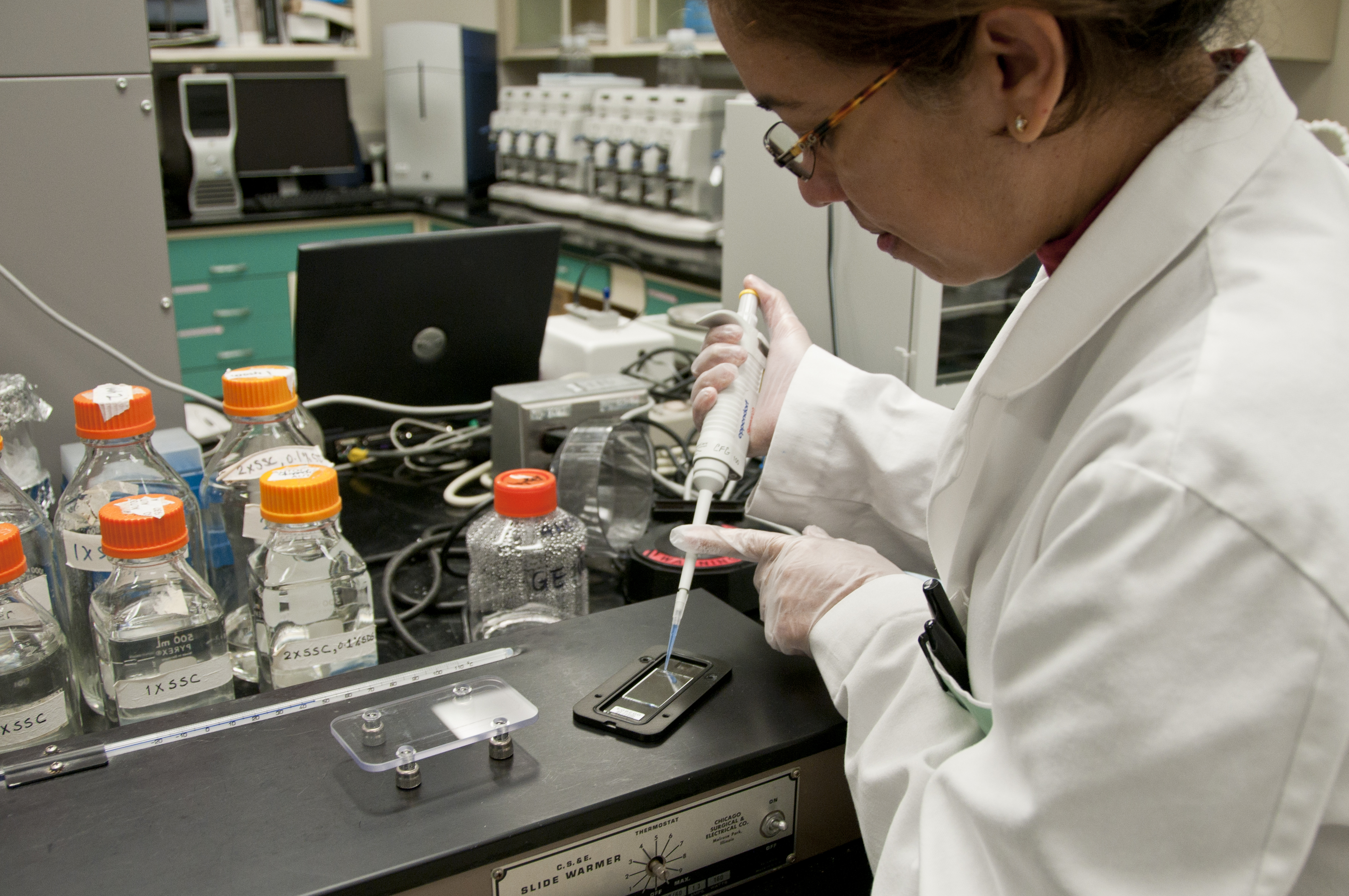
A toxicologist working in a lab (United States, 2008)

Toxicology is a scientific discipline, overlapping with biology, chemistry, pharmacology, and medicine, that involves the study of the adverse effects of chemical substances on living organisms and the practice of diagnosing and treating exposures to toxins and toxicants. The relationship between dose and its effects on the exposed organism is of high significance in toxicology. Factors that influence chemical toxicity include the dosage, duration of exposure (whether it is acute or chronic), route of exposure, species, age, sex, and environment. Toxicologists are experts on poisons and poisoning. There is a movement for evidence-based toxicology as part of the larger movement towards evidence-based practices. Toxicology is currently contributing to the field of cancer research, since some toxins can be used as drugs for killing tumor cells. One prime example of this is ribosome-inactivating proteins, tested in the treatment of leukemia.

The word toxicology (/ˌtɒksɪˈkɒlədʒi/) is a neoclassical compound from Neo-Latin, first attested c. 1799, from the combining forms toxico- + -logy, which in turn come from the Ancient Greek words τοξικός toxikos, "poisonous", and λόγος logos, "subject matter").

== History ==
Folio from the Kalpasthāna (Dundhubhisvanīya chapter), from a manuscript of the Śuśrutasaṃhitā, Nepal, 878 CE.

Unlike many civilizations, records of Egyptian knowledge and use of poisons can only be dated back to approximately 300 BC. However, it is believed that the earliest known Egyptian pharaoh, Menes, studied the properties of poisonous plants and venoms, according to early records.

The Egyptians are also thought to have come into knowledge about elements such as antimony, copper, crude arsenic, lead, opium, and mandrake (among others) which are mentioned in papyri. They carefully documented venomous snakes and scorpions, their effects, and treatments, using controlled herbal poisons in medicine, and are also thought to have been the first to master distillation and extract poison from apricot kernels.

The Kalpasthāna is a section of the Suśrutasaṃhitā, an ancient Sanskrit medical compendium composed before c. 300 CE, with portions possibly dating to the fourth century BCE.It is devoted to the study of plant and animal poisons, including their classification, identification, and treatment. The Kalpasthāna was influential on many later Sanskrit medical works and was translated into Arabic and other languages, influencing South East Asia, the Middle East, Tibet and eventually Europe.

Dioscorides, a Greek physician in the court of the Roman emperor Nero, made an early attempt to classify plants according to their toxic and therapeutic effect. A work attributed to the 10th century author Ibn Wahshiyya called the Book on Poisons describes various toxic substances and poisonous recipes that can be made using magic. In the 12th century, Jewish physician Maimonides wrote Kitāb al-Sumūm wa-l-Mutaḥarriz min al-Adwiya al-Qattāla ("Book on Poisons and the One Who Guards Against Deadly Drugs"), which discussed the treatment of poisoning. A 14th century Kannada poetic work attributed to the Jain prince Mangarasa, Khagendra Mani Darpana, describes several poisonous plants.

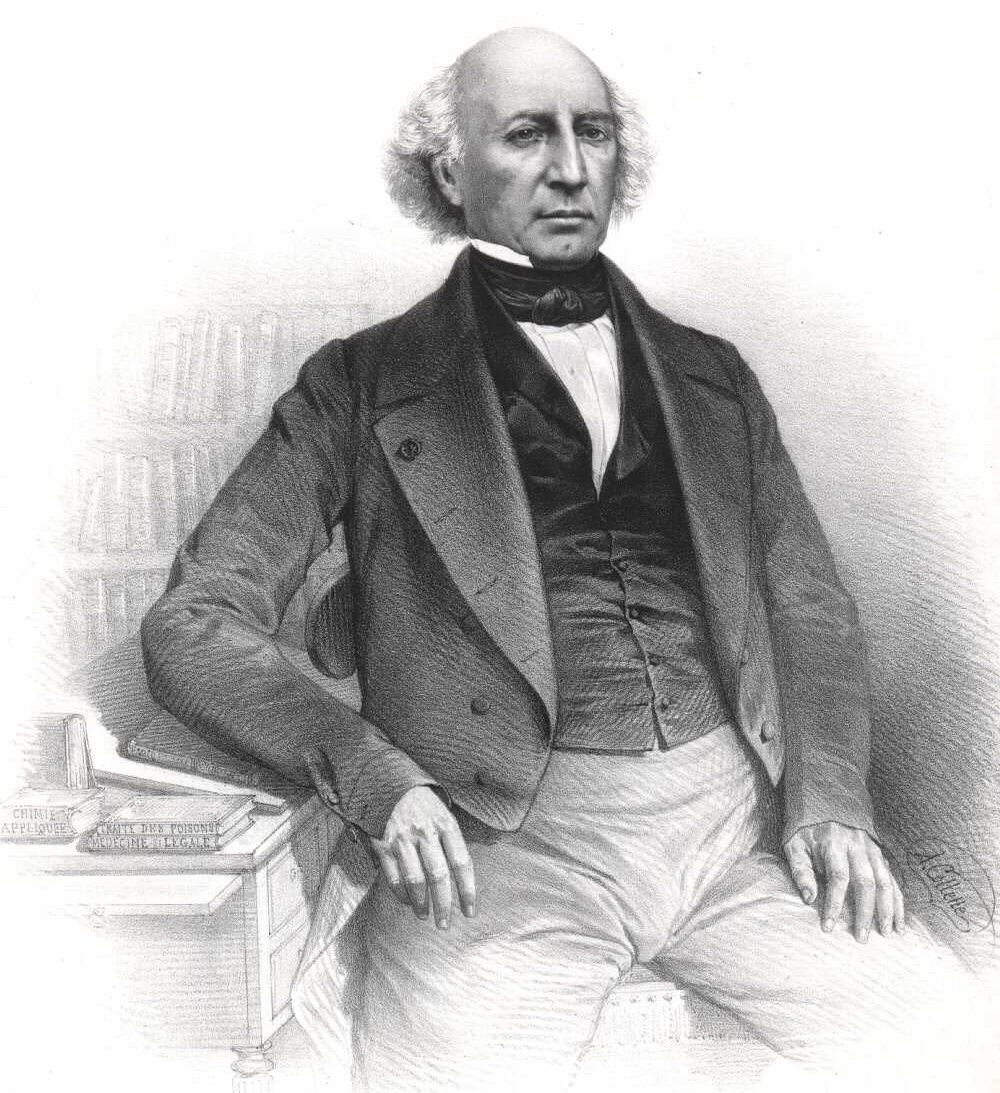
Lithograph of Mathieu Orfila

The late medieval philosopher Pietro d'Abano compiled a treatise on venoms and poisons drawing on earlier Greek sources, particularly works attributed to Dioscorides such as On Venoms and On Poisons. This work reflects an early engagement with Greek scientific traditions and has been viewed as a precursor to the later revival of Greek science associated with the Renaissance.

The 16th-century Swiss physician Paracelsus is considered "the father" of modern toxicology, based on his rigorous approach to understanding the effects of substances on the body. He is credited with the classic toxicology maxim, "Alle Dinge sind Gift und nichts ist ohne Gift; allein die Dosis macht, dass ein Ding kein Gift ist." which translates as, "All things are poisonous and nothing is without poison; only the dose makes a thing not poisonous." This is often condensed to: "The dose makes the poison" or in Latin "Sola dosis facit venenum".

Mathieu Orfila is also considered the modern father of toxicology, having given the subject its first formal treatment in 1813 in his Traité des poisons, also called Toxicologie générale.

In 1850, Jean Stas became the first person to successfully isolate plant poisons from human tissue. This allowed him to identify the use of nicotine as a poison in the Bocarmé murder case, providing the evidence needed to convict the Belgian Count Hippolyte Visart de Bocarmé of killing his brother-in-law.

In the modern era, regulatory oversight of toxicology has shifted to specialized governmental and international bodies, including the U.S. Food and Drug Administration (FDA), the Environmental Protection Agency (EPA), and the World Health Organization (WHO), which enforce standardized protocols to assess chemical risks in food, drugs, and the environment. Building on Paracelsus's foundational dose-response principle, these agencies guide evidence-based safety evaluations through tiered toxicity studies and data interpretation. The FDA's Redbook 2000 exemplifies this continued evolution, serving as a pivotal guidance document for toxicological principles in assessing food additives and ingredients, ensuring public health protections aligned with contemporary scientific rigor.

== Basic principles ==
The goal of toxicity assessment is to identify adverse effects of a substance. Adverse effects depend on two main factors: i) routes of exposure (oral, inhalation, or dermal) and ii) dose (duration and concentration of exposure). To explore dose, substances are tested in both acute and chronic models. Generally, different sets of experiments are conducted to determine whether a substance causes cancer and to examine other forms of toxicity.

Factors that influence chemical toxicity:

- Dosage
  - Both large single exposures (acute) and continuous small exposures (chronic) are studied.
- Route of exposure
  - Ingestion, inhalation or skin absorption
- Other factors
  - Species
  - Age
  - Sex
  - Health
  - Environment
  - Individual characteristics

The discipline of evidence-based toxicology strives to transparently, consistently, and objectively assess available scientific evidence in order to answer questions in toxicology, the study of the adverse effects of chemical, physical, or biological agents on living organisms and the environment, including the prevention and amelioration of such effects. Evidence-based toxicology has the potential to address concerns in the toxicological community about the limitations of current approaches to assessing the state of the science. These include concerns related to transparency in decision-making, synthesis of different types of evidence, and the assessment of bias and credibility. Evidence-based toxicology has its roots in the larger movement towards evidence-based practices.

== Testing methods ==
Toxicity experiments may be conducted in vivo (using the whole animal) or in vitro (testing on isolated cells or tissues), or in silico (in a computer simulation).

=== In vivo model organism ===
The classic experimental tool of toxicology is testing on non-human animals. Examples of model organisms are Galleria mellonella, which can replace small mammals, Zebrafish (Danio rerio), which allow for the study of toxicology in a lower order vertebrate in vivo and Caenorhabditis elegans. As of 2014, such animal testing provides information that is not available by other means about how substances function in a living organism. The use of non-human animals for toxicology testing is opposed by some organisations for reasons of animal welfare, and it has been restricted or banned under some circumstances in certain regions, such as the testing of cosmetics in the European Union.

=== In vitro methods ===
While testing in animal models remains as a method of estimating human effects, there are both ethical and technical concerns with animal testing.

Since the late 1950s, the field of toxicology has sought to reduce or eliminate animal testing under the rubric of "Three Rs" – reduce the number of experiments with animals to the minimum necessary; refine experiments to cause less suffering, and replace in vivo experiments with other types, or use more simple forms of life when possible. The historical development of alternative testing methods in toxicology has been published by Balls.

Computer modeling is an example of an alternative in vitro toxicology testing method; using computer models of chemicals and proteins, structure-activity relationships can be determined, and chemical structures that are likely to bind to, and interfere with, proteins with essential functions, can be identified. This work requires expert knowledge in molecular modeling and statistics together with expert judgment in chemistry, biology and toxicology.

In 2007 the American NGO National Academy of Sciences published a report called "Toxicity Testing in the 21st Century: A Vision and a Strategy" which opened with a statement: "Change often involves a pivotal event that builds on previous history and opens the door to a new era. Pivotal events in science include the discovery of penicillin, the elucidation of the DNA double helix, and the development of computers. ... Toxicity testing is approaching such a scientific pivot point. It is poised to take advantage of the revolutions in biology and biotechnology. Advances in toxicogenomics, bioinformatics, systems biology, epigenetics, and computational toxicology could transform toxicity testing from a system based on whole-animal testing to one founded primarily on in vitro methods that evaluate changes in biologic processes using cells, cell lines, or cellular components, preferably of human origin." As of 2014 that vision was still unrealized.

The United States Environmental Protection Agency studied 1,065 chemical and drug substances in their ToxCast program (part of the CompTox Chemicals Dashboard) using in silica modelling and a human pluripotent stem cell-based assay to predict in vivo developmental intoxicants based on changes in cellular metabolism following chemical exposure. Major findings from the analysis of this ToxCast_STM dataset published in 2020 include: (1) 19% of 1065 chemicals yielded a prediction of developmental toxicity, (2) assay performance reached 79%–82% accuracy with high specificity (> 84%) but modest sensitivity (< 67%) when compared with in vivo animal models of human prenatal developmental toxicity, (3) sensitivity improved as more stringent weights of evidence requirements were applied to the animal studies, and (4) statistical analysis of the most potent chemical hits on specific biochemical targets in ToxCast revealed positive and negative associations with the STM response, providing insights into the mechanistic underpinnings of the targeted endpoint and its biological domain.

In some cases shifts away from animal studies have been mandated by law or regulation; the European Union (EU) prohibited use of animal testing for cosmetics in 2013.

== Dose response complexities ==
Most chemicals display a classic dose response curve – at a low dose (below a threshold), no effect is observed. Some show a phenomenon known as sufficient challenge – a small exposure produces animals that "grow more rapidly, have better general appearance and coat quality, have fewer tumors, and live longer than the control animals". A few chemicals have no well-defined safe level of exposure. These are treated with special care. Some chemicals are subject to bioaccumulation as they are stored in rather than being excreted from the body; these also receive special consideration.

Several measures are commonly used to describe toxic dosages according to the degree of effect on an organism or a population, and some are specifically defined by various laws or organizational usage. These include:

- LD50 or LD_{50} = Median lethal dose, a dose that will kill 50% of an exposed population
- NOEL = No-Observed-Effect-Level, the highest dose known to show no effect
- NOAEL = No-Observed-Adverse-Effect-Level, the highest dose known to show no adverse effects
- PEL = Permissible Exposure Limit, the highest concentration permitted under US OSHA regulations
- STEL = Short-Term Exposure Limit, the highest concentration permitted for short periods of time, in general 15–30 minutes
- TWA = Time-Weighted Average, the average amount of an agent's concentration over a specified period of time, usually 8 hours
- TTC = The Threshold of Toxicological Concern concept has been applied to low-level contaminants, such as the constituents of tobacco smoke

== Types ==
Brochure illustrating the work of the CDC Division of Laboratory Sciences

Medical toxicology is the discipline that requires physician status (MD or DO degree plus specialty education and experience).

Clinical toxicology is the discipline that can be practiced not only by physicians but also other health professionals with a master's degree in clinical toxicology: physician extenders (physician assistants, nurse practitioners), nurses, pharmacists, and allied health professionals.

Forensic toxicology is the discipline that makes use of toxicology and other disciplines such as analytical chemistry, pharmacology and clinical chemistry to aid medical or legal investigation of death, poisoning, and drug use. The primary concern for forensic toxicology is not the legal outcome of the toxicological investigation or the technology utilized, but rather the obtainment and interpretation of results.

Computational toxicology is a discipline that develops mathematical and computer-based models to better understand and predict adverse health effects caused by chemicals, such as environmental pollutants and pharmaceuticals. Within the Toxicology in the 21st Century project, the best predictive models were identified to be Deep Neural Networks, Random Forest, and Support Vector Machines, which can reach the performance of in vitro experiments.

Occupational toxicology is the application of toxicology to chemical hazards in the workplace.

== Toxicology as a profession ==
A toxicologist is a scientist or medical personnel who specializes in the study of chemicals to determine if they are harmful to living organisms. They may analyze symptoms, mechanisms, treatments and detection of venoms and toxins; especially the poisoning of people. There are several types of toxicologist including medical, academic and non-profit.

=== Requirements ===
To work as a toxicologist one should obtain a degree in toxicology or a related degree like biology, chemistry, pharmacology or biochemistry. Bachelor's degree programs in toxicology cover the chemical makeup of toxins and their effects on biochemistry, physiology and ecology. After introductory life science courses are complete, students typically enroll in labs and apply toxicology principles to research and other studies. Advanced students delve into specific sectors, like the pharmaceutical industry or law enforcement, which apply methods of toxicology in their work.

The Society of Toxicology (SOT) recommends that undergraduates in postsecondary schools that do not offer a bachelor's degree in toxicology consider attaining a degree in biology or chemistry. Additionally, the SOT advises aspiring toxicologists to take statistics and mathematics courses, as well as gain laboratory experience through lab courses, student research projects and internships. In the USA, Medical Toxicologists complete residency training such as in Emergency Medicine, Pediatrics or Internal Medicine, followed by fellowship in Medical Toxicology and eventual certification by the American College of Medical Toxicology (ACMT).

=== Duties ===
Toxicologists perform many different duties including research in the academic, nonprofit and industrial fields, product safety evaluation, consulting, public service and legal regulation. In order to research and assess the effects of chemicals, toxicologists perform carefully designed studies and experiments. These experiments help identify the specific amount of a chemical that may cause harm and potential risks of being near or using products that contain certain chemicals. Research projects may range from assessing the effects of toxic pollutants on the environment to evaluating how the human immune system responds to chemical compounds within pharmaceutical drugs. While the basic duties of toxicologists are to determine the effects of chemicals on organisms and their surroundings, specific job duties may vary based on industry and employment. For example, forensic toxicologists may look for toxic substances in a crime scene, whereas aquatic toxicologists may analyze the toxicity level of water bodies.

=== Compensation ===
The salary for jobs in toxicology is dependent on several factors, including level of schooling, specialization, experience. The U.S. Bureau of Labor Statistics (BLS) noted that jobs for biological scientists, which generally include toxicologists, were expected to increase by 21% between 2008 and 2018; the BLS noted that this increase could be due to research and development growth in biotechnology, as well as budget increases for basic and medical research in biological science.

== See also ==
- Aquatic toxicology
- Automatism (toxicology)
- Certain safety factor
- Children's Environmental Exposure Research Study (CHEERS) (in the US)
- Ecotoxicology
- Entomotoxicology
- Environmental health
- Environmental toxicology
- Enzyme inhibition
- Exposure science
- Exposome
- Forensic toxicology
- History of poison
- In vitro toxicology
- Indicative limit value
- Modes of toxic action
- Nanotoxicology
- Neurotoxicology
- Occupational toxicology
- Ototoxicity
- Overdose
- Risk Information Exchange
- Pollution
- Toxicogenomics
- Toxicology Mechanisms and Methods (journal)
- Toxinology
- Unacceptable Levels (2013 documentary film)
