= Automatism =

Automatism may refer to:

- Automatism (medicine), spontaneous verbal or motor behavior
- Automatism (law), a defense used in criminal law
- Automatism (toxicology), when an individual repeatedly takes a medication because the individual forgets previous doses
- Automatic writing, the process, or product, of writing material that does not come from the conscious thoughts of the writer
- Surrealist automatism, an art technique

== See also ==
- Automatic (disambiguation)
