= Discourse coalition =

Emerging out of sociology, and associated with the argumentative turn in policy analysis, discourse coalition is a technical term for the social phenomenon which describes how a diffuse group of individuals, organizations, and institutions who are not necessarily explicitly or formally connected nonetheless coordinate around a shared understanding of the world.

== Origin and Development ==
Introduced in 1987 by Peter Wagner and Björn Wittrock, and further developed in 1989 by Maarten Hajer, the term discourse coalition describes how affiliations of actors develop and deploy a line of discourse in order to influence public opinion.

As Hajer notes, discourse can be defined as “an ensemble of ideas, concepts, and categories through which meaning is given to phenomena.” However, any given discourse cannot be comprehensive or total. Rather, Hajer continues, a discourse must foreground certain ideas, concepts, or categories in order to “frame certain problems.” These complex problems are then simplified by the discourse into a “narrative” or a “story line” which actors go on to rally around and repeat.

For Hajer, then, “a discourse coalition is the ensemble of a set of story lines, the actors that utter these story lines, and the practices that conform to these story lines, all organized around a discourse.”

== See also ==
- discourse
- political sociology
- social movements
- fusion of horizons
