= Evidence-based conservation =

Nature conservation efforts driven by evidence

Evidence-based conservation is the application of evidence in conservation biology and environmental management actions and policy making. It is defined as systematically assessing scientific information from published, peer-reviewed publications and texts, practitioners' experiences, independent expert assessment, and local and indigenous knowledge on a specific conservation topic. This includes assessing the current effectiveness of different management interventions, threats and emerging problems and economic factors.

Evidence-based conservation was organized based on the observations that decision making in conservation was based on intuition and or practitioner experience often disregarding other forms of evidence of successes and failures (e.g. scientific information). This has led to costly and poor outcomes. Evidence-based conservation provides access to information that will support decision making through an evidence-based framework of "what works" in conservation.

The evidence-based approach to conservation is based on evidence-based practice which started in medicine and later spread to nursing, education, psychology and other fields. It is part of the larger movement towards evidence-based practices.

== Systematic review ==
A systematic review consists of a non-subjective assessment of available data and evidence related to management. Synthesizing results from different studies over different time periods, locations or sample sizes can reduce the bias present in individual studies. Systematic reviews differ from traditional reviews by being easily understood, peer-reviewed and repeatable. Detailed protocols remain available for conducting a thorough, unbiased systematic review.

In a Cochrane systematic review, there is little evidence that environmental conservation, and enhancement activities can have any effect on adults' well-being and health. However, there is a high level of perceived benefits based on the feedback of the participants.

== Synopsis ==
Part of implementing an evidence-based conservation analysis requires generating a synopsis. This refers to the brief description of a single study or a systematic review. Synopses form the building blocks of summaries when collated across specific themes.

== Summary ==
A summary is broader than a synopsis and refers to the standardized description of results extracted from several studies or systematic reviews on a particular topic. Summaries are regularly updated as more information becomes available and are ideally generated through a rigorous review process.

== History ==
Evidence-based conservation is inspired by evidence-based medicine. Evidence-based conservation was first noted in the literature in 2000. Over the last decade, the methodology for generating systematic reviews (e.g. protocols, systematic maps) have been improved and standardized. In addition, several collaborative networks have been formed and two journals have been launched. The Collaboration for Environmental Evidence has a journal titled Environmental Evidence dedicated to the publication of systematic reviews, review protocols and systematic maps on impacts of human activity and the effectiveness of management interventions. It currently has centres located in Australia, Sweden, South Africa, Canada, France and the UK. The Conservation Evidence group has a journal titled Conservation Evidence that was launched in 2004 to document the effectiveness of conservation interventions.

Conservation Evidence is a web-based database repository that systematizes and provides access to conservation efforts, programs, and research on the biodiversity and the environment based on high quality, reviewed publications.

== Critique ==
Since evidence-based conservation is based on the primary data on interventions, it is as good as the available data. Even when data are available, some authors have noted that evidence-based conservation may not be routinely used in decision making for management and conservation policy. Often there may be a disconnect between the science that is produced and the management interventions taken. Three reasons have been suggested for this in the literature:

1. the scope of the scientific questions may not cover adequately the management requirements (this translates to lack of "actionable evidence" for management),
2. the scientific research produced covers the management needs, yet the recommendations from the evidence may not be feasible for implementation due to practical constraints (time, financial budgets etc.) or
3. the conservation practitioners do not have access to the evidence. Often peer reviewed journal articles produced by scientists are not freely available (open access) or use complicated jargon that managers may not always comprehend. In a survey in eastern England, it was found that park managers get only 2.4% of their information from primary scientific literature. These areas need further attention in the future.

Evidence-based conservation has also been criticised in the past for ignoring traditional forms of knowledge and experience. However, the steps of evidence-based conservation can be designed to take traditional forms of knowledge into consideration.

== See also ==
- Effective altruism – Philosophical and social movement
- Evidence-based legislation – Decisions and practices that use evidence to enact laws
- Evidence-based policy – Approach to decision-making and policy based on empirical data and analysis
- Evidence-based practice – Pragmatic methodology

== Bibliography ==
- Salafsky, Nick, et al. "Improving the practice of conservation: a conceptual framework and research agenda for conservation science." Conservation biology 16.6 (2002): 1469–1479.
- Pullin, Andrew S., and Teri M. Knight. "Doing more good than harm–Building an evidence-base for conservation and environmental management." Biological Conservation 142.5 (2009): 931–934.
- Sutherland, William J., et al. "The need for evidence-based conservation." Trends in ecology & evolution 19.6 (2004): 305–308.
- Brooks, Jeremy S., et al. "Testing hypotheses for the success of different conservation strategies." Conservation biology 20.5 (2006): 1528–1538.
- "Box 1 : Conservation: Dollars and sense", Nature, International Weekly Journal of Science. September 29, 2005. pp. 614–616
