= Argumentative turn =

Policy analysis approaches emphasizing argumentation's relevance

The "argumentative turn" refers to a group of different approaches in policy analysis and planning that emphasize the increased relevance of argumentation, language and presentation in policy making. Inspired by the "linguistic turn" in the field of humanities, it was developed as an alternative to the epistemological limitations of "neo-positivist" policy analysis and its underlying technocratic understanding of the decision-making process. The argumentative approach systematically integrates empirical and normative questions into a methodological whole oriented towards the analysis of policy deliberation. It is sensitive to the immediate (status quo) and the many kinds of knowledge practices involved in each phase of the policy process, bringing attention to different forms of argumentation, persuasion and justification.

== Overview ==
The term "argumentative turn" was introduced by Frank Fischer and John F. Forester in the introduction to their edited volume "The argumentative turn in policy analysis and planning", published in 1993, assembling a group of different approaches towards policy analysis that share an emphasis on the importance of language, meaning, rhetoric and values as key features in the analysis of policy-making and planning. As a shift away from the positivistic and technocratic implications of the dominant empirical approach to problem-solving, the argumentative turn tries to offer an alternative perspective towards policy inquiry. Instead of focusing exclusively on empiricist law-like logical inference and causal explanation, the post-empiricist approach highlights numerous forms of social research practices, thereby not disqualifying the search for empirically valid data, but embedding scientific expertise into a meaningful social context. The argumentative approach therefore rejects the assumption that policy analysis can be a value-free, technical project, since it always involves complex combinations of descriptive and normative elements. As a commitment to deliberative and participatory conceptions of democracy, the argumentative perspective also rejects a top-down understanding of governance, testifying to the dynamic exchange between public and private interests and the important role of experts in the complex processes of policy-making. The policy-analyst is no longer concerned with the improvement of political performance, but tries to stimulate the political process of policy deliberation, thereby promoting communicative competences and social learning.

== Emergence of the argumentative approach ==
The argumentative approach towards policy analysis grew out of a disappointment with the prevailing intellectual setting, since the 60s largely dominated by the "rational project" of neo-positivist political science, and its tendency to mask political and bureaucratic interests behind an ideology of science as a value free project. In 1989, Giandomenico Majone published 'Evidence, Argument, and Persuasion in Policy Analysis' that together with Deborah Stone's "Policy Paradox" (1988) and John S. Dryzek's "Discursive Democracy" (1990) became key texts in the formative process of the new argumentative perspective on policy analysis. But it was not until Frank Fischer and John F. Forester proclaimed "The Argumentative Turn in Policy Analysis and Planning" (1993) that argumentative policy analysis became a distinctive approach with a well defined research agenda, which moved language, argumentation and rhetoric to the center of attention. Although other approaches to policy analysis also highlighted the important role of ideas, they tended to conceptualize language only as one variable next to others, thereby neglecting its constitutive role in the construction of social reality. The argumentative approach on the other hand puts a more sophisticated emphasis and a deeper understanding to important aspects of language and discourse in the policy process. Ideas and discourse are not only means for actors trying to achieve particular ends, but they have a force of their own, especially in combination with relations of power, since they both carry knowledge and frame social reality.

== Theoretical tradition ==
Building on Harold Lasswell, founder of the "policy science orientation", the argumentative perspective combines a multidisciplinary approach to policy analysis with an explicitly normative orientation towards democratic values. Therefore, it integrates multiple theoretical perspectives that altogether highlight the importance of language and meaning in the context of social inquiry: British ordinary language analysis, French post-structuralism, Frankfurt school of critical social theory and American pragmatism. On the one hand, the importance of the work of Jürgen Habermas on communicative action and his critique of technocracy and scientism, together with Michel Foucault's writings on discourse and power cannot be overestimated in their contribution of major theoretical elements to the development of the argumentative approach. The contextual orientation towards the situated nature of argumentative praxis, on the other hand, was heavily influenced 1) by the tradition of "ordinary language philosophy", especially the later work of Ludwig Wittgenstein and John L. Austin's speech act theory, and 2) by scholars of pragmatism, like George Herbert Mead, John Dewey, Charles S. Peirce and Richard Rorty. Nonetheless, due to the multiple and dispersed perspectives on language and meaning the argumentative approach tries to articulate, there exist great variations concerning the basic theoretical assumptions (hermeneutics, structuralism/post-structuralism, pragmatism).

== Knowledge and deliberative practice ==
Instead of offering a comprehensive theory of knowledge, the argumentative approach tries to focus on a better description of what social scientist already do. Science is understood as a socio-cultural practice mediated by symbolic systems of meaning, located in historically specific places and communities. Therefore, the argumentative approach rejects neo-positivistic versions of correspondence theory, rather building scientific investigation on a coherence theory of truth, thereby giving voice to the importance of inter-subjective practices of argumentation and deliberation. Every empirical proposition is haunted by factors of indeterminacy, while empirical data only makes sense located in a meaningful context. The argumentative approach therefore tries to develop a richer perspective on political controversies, which cannot be understood to be about raw data, but rather about the conflicting assumptions that organize them. Logical deduction and empirical falsification cannot make sense of a world that is much more complex and in flux, than necessary for the maintenance of the neo-positivist perspective. Therefore, the post-empiricist framework involves a multimethodological approach, that substitutes the formal logic of neo-positivism, with something that Aristotle called phronesis - an informal deliberative framework of practical reason. This conception of reason proofs to be a more accurate response to the forms of rationality exhibited in real-world policy analysis and implementation.

== Assembling different approaches ==
The argumentative turn links different approaches in the field of policy science that altogether put a strong emphasis on the important role of language and meaning:

- Argumentative policy analysis (Fischer 2003a, Gottweis 2006)
- Participatory policy analysis (Fischer 1990, 2007)
- Interpretative policy analysis (Yanow 1996, 2006)
- Policy frame analysis (Schön and Rein 1994, Yanow 2006, Waagenar 2011)
- Critical policy discourse analysis (Gottweis 1998, Hajer 1995, Wagenaar 2011, Yanow 2006)
- Post-structuralist Policy Analysis (Gottweis 1998)
- Narrative policy analysis (Roe 1994)
- Rhetorical policy analysis (Gottweis 2006)
- Communicative policy analysis (Fischer 2007)
- Dramaturgical policy analysis (Hajer and Veersteg 2005)
- Deliberative policy analysis (Hajer and Wagenaar 2003)
- Discourse coalition theory (Hajer 2005)

== Critique and reaction ==
The main critique often pointed against discursive approaches and their focus on narratives, language and deliberation, is that they imply 1) a version of idealism and 2) forms of scientific, moral and political relativism.

Against the first point, the argumentative approach does not deny the existence of a world out there, but rather points to the cognitive limits of scientific inquiry. Whatever the inner nature of the world out there might be, we have no immediate access to it. Our perspective on the world is always mediated by socio-cultural systems of meaning and the cognitive frames that are expressions of our situated knowledge. Discourse operate as conditions of possibility of experience, since they provide reality with meaning and draw a line between the visible and the invisible.

The second point is directed against the contextualism of the argumentative approach, saying that there is no point from which to distinguish the true from the false or the good from the bad, so every perspective is equal to another. But this view from nowhere, where everything has the status of being valid in same way, does not exist for the post-positivist researcher. The perspective of the policy-analyst is always already organized according to a shared horizon of meaning, where she can put herself into the positions of reflective distance, but cannot transcend it. Political actors, social scientists and people doing their everyday business always use specific systems of evaluation and judgment, which are actualized or transformed in the context of their inter-subjective deliberative practices. On the one hand, building on Foucault, discourse has to be connected to the analysis of relations of power, although communicative practises cannot be reduced to mere manifestations of dominance or ideology. On the other hand, sticking to Habermas, the approach makes an explicit normative commitment towards conceptions of deliberative democracy, thereby facilitating dialogical exchange and debate between actors with different interests and perspectives.

In policy debate, discourse in ranked much lower than oratory, as the former has no goal of persuasion nor to even be understood. The process and procedures of "staging", "drawing", "building", "commitment", "framework" and such rubric are flawed, according to ordinary logic and speech communication. Failing on language alone, the enterprise is confounded and so has been declasséd as "kritikality" or nonessential no different from "opinion-making" that has little to do with sharing resources.
