= Evidence-based Toxicology Collaboration =

Non-profit science organization

The non-profit Evidence-based Toxicology Collaboration (EBTC) comprises a group of scientists and experts with ties to governmental and non-governmental agencies, chemical and pharmaceutical companies, and academia that have banded together to promote the use of what are known as "evidence-based approaches" in toxicology. The discipline of evidence-based toxicology (EBT) is a process for transparently, consistently, and objectively assessing available scientific evidence in order to answer questions in toxicology. EBT has the potential to address concerns in the toxicological community about the limitations of current approaches. These include concerns related to transparency in decision making, synthesis of different types of evidence, and the assessment of bias and credibility. The evidence-based methods and approaches now being proposed for toxicology are widely used in medicine, which is the basis for their nomenclature. The need to improve how the performance of toxicological test methods is assessed was the main impetus for translating these tools to toxicology.

== Goals and benefits ==
The EBTC's overall goals are to bring together the international toxicology community to facilitate uses of evidence-based toxicology to inform regulatory, environmental and public health decisions. The group aims for improving the public health outcomes and reduce human impact on the environment by bringing evidence-based approaches to safety sciences The organization's members envision that as these efforts succeed, all interested parties – including stakeholders in government, industry, academia, and the general public – should have confidence and trust in the process by which scientific evidence is assessed when addressing questions related to the safety of chemicals to human health and the environment. All individuals affiliated with the organization are volunteers, except those serving in the organisation's secretariat, which is sponsored by the Johns Hopkins University's Center for Alternatives to Animal Testing (CAAT).

The EBTC's members stress that evidence has always been used in toxicology. The evidence-based approach that the collaboration is championing have been used in medicine for decades. Evidence-based medicine (EBM) is a widely respected discipline and it has strengthened the scientific foundation of decision-making in clinical medicine by providing a structured way of assessing the evidence bearing on healthcare questions.

The EBTC foresees that the evidence-based approach will provide similar benefits to toxicology, especially at a time when remarkable advances in biochemistry and molecular biology are enhancing scientists’ ability to understand the nature and mechanisms of the adverse effects that can be caused by chemicals.

== Origins ==
The EBTC builds upon the outcomes of the First International Forum Toward Evidence-based Toxicology, held in Cernobbio/Como, Italy, on October 15–18, 2007. The forum was motivated by increasing concerns in the scientific community about the limitations of toxicological decision-making.

EBT was next a major topic of discussion at a 2010 workshop held at Johns Hopkins University on 21st century validation for 21st century methods. The enthusiasm for EBT at this workshop inspired the EBTC's formation with an inaugural conference on March 10, 2011, as a satellite to the 50th annual Society of Toxicology meeting in Washington, DC. At the workshop, speakers presented the concept of EBT as it pertains to decision-making about the utility of new toxicity tests and their implementation into the risk assessment process.

== Tools ==
The EBTC is translating the tools used in evidence-based medicine (EBM) to toxicology, as well as developing new approaches to respond to the challenges presented by the discipline of toxicology. The primary tool of EBM is the systematic review, which includes a variety of steps: framing the question to be addressed and deciding how relevant studies will be identified and retrieved; determining which studies will be excluded from the analysis, and how the included studies will be appraised for quality/potential for bias; and how the data will be synthesized across studies (e.g., meta-analysis). Scientists have made progress in their efforts to apply systematic reviews to evaluate the evidence for associations between environmental toxicants and human health risks. To date, researchers have shown that important elements of the systematic review methodology established in evidence-based medicine can be adopted into EBT, and a limited number of such studies have been attempted. EBTC scientists are promoting and conducting systematic reviews of toxicological test methods.

== Organization ==
The EBTC is governed by a board of trustees that has the fundamental responsibilities to provide strategic and fiduciary oversight, and direction. In addition, the Scientific Advisory Council has been established to provide the expertise needed to develop the new EBT methods, to conduct specific projects and to advise the Board and the EBTC Director on new areas of research and other scientific issues of relevance to the broader toxicology community. The organization also has working groups charged with producing guidance documents tailored to toxicology on conducting systematic reviews and their components. Working groups are also focused on the application of evidence-based tools to various toxicological practices.

Scientists affiliated with the EBTC are conducting pilot studies to demonstrate the value of evidence-based approaches for helping researchers evaluate new laboratory tools and tests for assessing chemical toxicity.

== See also ==
- Evidence-based toxicology
