= PICO process =

Medical mnemonic for framing questions

The PICO process (or framework) is a mnemonic used in evidence-based practice (and specifically evidence-based medicine) to frame and answer a clinical or health care related question, though it is also argued that PICO "can be used universally for every scientific endeavour in any discipline with all study designs". The PICO framework is also used to develop literature search strategies, for instance in systematic reviews.

The PICO acronym has come to stand for:

- P – Patient, problem, or population
- I – Intervention
- C – Comparison, control, or comparator
- O – Outcome(s) (e.g. pain, fatigue, nausea, infections, death)

An application that covers clinical questions about interventions, as well as exposures, risk/ prognostic factors, and test accuracy, is:

- P – Patient, problem, or population
- I – Investigated condition (e.g. intervention, exposure, risk/ prognostic factor, or test result)
- C – Comparison condition (e.g. intervention, exposure, risk/ prognostic factor, or test result respectively)
- O – Outcome(s) (e.g. symptom, syndrome, or disease of interest)

Alternatives such as SPICE and PECO (among many others) can also be used. Some authors suggest adding T and S, as follows:

- T - Timing (e.g. duration of intervention, or date of publication)
- S - Study type (e.g. randomized controlled trial, cohort study, etc.)

== PICO as a universal technique ==
It was argued that PICO may be useful for every scientific endeavor even beyond clinical settings. This proposal is based on a more abstract view of the PICO mnemonic, equating them with four components that is inherent to every single research, namely (1) research object; (2) application of a theory or method; (3) alternative theories or methods (or the null hypothesis); and (4) the ultimate goal of knowledge generation.

Juxtaposing PICO with universal components of all research endeavors
PICO component	Abstract component inherent to all research designs
Problem	Research object
Intervention	Application of a theory or method
Comparison	Alternative theories or methods (or, in their absence, the null hypothesis)
Outcome	Knowledge generation

This proposition would imply that the PICO technique could be used for teaching academic writing even beyond medical disciplines.

== Examples ==
Clinical question: "In children with headache, is paracetamol more effective than placebo against pain?"

- Population = Children with headaches; keywords = children + headache
- Intervention = Paracetamol; keyword = paracetamol
- Compared with = Placebo; keyword = placebo
- Outcome of interest = Pain; keyword = pain

PubMed (health research database) search strategy: children headache paracetamol placebo pain

Clinical question: "Is the risk of having breast cancer higher in symptom-free women with a positive mammography compared to symptom-free women with a negative mammography?"

- Population = Women without a history of breast cancer
- Investigated test result = Positive result on mammography
- Comparator test result = Negative result on mammography
- Outcome of interest = Breast cancer according to biopsy (or not)

== Similar Frameworks ==
The PICO framework was originally developed to frame interventional clinical questions. PICO inspired other frameworks such as PICOS, PICOT, PICOTT, PECO, PICOTS, PECODR, PEICOIS, PICOC, SPICE, PIPOH, EPICOT+, PESICO, PICo, and PS.
