= Risk Information Exchange =

Database for chemical risk assessments

The Risk Information Exchange (RiskIE) is an internet database created in 2007 by Toxicology Excellence for Risk Assessment (TERA). The database provides in-progress and recently completed chemical risk assessments. RiskIE is designed to help scientists stay aware of current chemical evaluations, identify opportunities for collaborations, and decide how to efficiently proceed with chemical registration with organizations such as the European Union's Registration, Evaluation, Authorisation, and Restriction of Chemicals (REACH). The United Nations Office for Disaster Risk Reduction (UNDRR) also uses this database, claiming that as of 2022, it is already in use in 52 countries.

== History ==
Michael Dourson, previously a toxicologist with the United States Environmental Protection Agency, founded TERA in 1995. After 21 years as an independent organization, TERA merged with the University of Cincinnati, College of Medicine, where it continued operation. Two years later, the University and Cincinnati and TERA opted to dissolve their partnership.

== ITER Database ==
TERA provides an online database named the International Toxicity Estimates for Risk database (ITER), which provides chronic human health risk assessment data from several organizations worldwide, explains the differences in those risk values, and links to the organizations' websites. It is the only database that has risk information from independent parties that have undergone independent peer review.

ITER supports the mission of the Alliance for Risk Assessment (ARA) by tracking information risk assessment activities and values.

== Funding ==
According to a joint investigation of the Inside Climate News and the Center for Public Integrity, TERA's risk-assessment database "receives financial and in-kind support from many companies and government agencies." A review of TERA's website shows that funding is approximately two thirds government and other non-profit organizations and approximately one third industry and industry-related.
