= Evidence-based assessment =

Review approach based on empirical evidence

Evidence-based assessment (EBA) refers to the application of research and theory in selecting constructs for a specific assessment purpose, as well as informing the methods and measures used in the assessment process. This approach recognizes that, despite data from psychometrically robust measures, the assessment process inherently involves iterative decision-making. Clinicians formulate and test hypotheses by integrating often incomplete and inconsistent data. EBA has been shown to aid clinicians in reducing cognitive biases in their clinical decisions. Evidence-based assessment is a component of the broader movement towards evidence-based practices.

The concept of evidence-based assessment originated in the field of medicine, and has since been adopted in several other disciplines, notably clinical psychology. The EBA approach is widely recognized as an empirically driven method of clinical decision-making. Cochrane reviews have reported the efficacy of EBA methods.

== Limitations ==
=== Test selection and inadequate assessment ===
Despite the availability of numerous guidelines to assist psychologists in conducting evidence-based assessments (EBAs), professionals often fall short in adhering to these guidelines. Projective tests, for instance, are frequently employed in the assessment of child adjustment. It has been observed that there is considerable variability among professionals in following professional guidelines, leading to instances where evaluators fail to assess general parenting abilities adequately.

=== Issues in test interpretation ===
Professionals and authorities often erroneously recommend interpreting variability between and within scales that might not have been rigorously tested. For example, due to thorough efforts in establishing norms, reliability, and validity measures, certain measures like the Wechsler intelligence scales for both adults and children are considered as some of the most reliable psychological instruments. Authorities often advise the consideration of subtest scores. However, unlike full-scale IQ scores, subtest scores frequently have lower levels of internal consistency reliability. This results in reduced precision of measurement and an increased likelihood of false positive and false negative conclusions about the assessment.
