= Automatism (toxicology) =

Automatism, in toxicology, refers to a tendency to take a drug over and over again, forgetting each time that one has already taken the dose. This can lead to a cumulative overdose. A particular example is barbiturates which were once commonly used as hypnotic (sleep inducing) drugs. Among the current hypnotics, benzodiazepines, especially midazolam might show marked automatism, possibly through their intrinsic anterograde amnesia effect. Barbiturates are known to induce hyperalgesia, i.e. aggravation of pain and for sleeplessness due to pain, if barbiturates are used, more pain and more disorientation would follow leading to drug automation and finally a "pseudo"suicide. Such reports dominated the medical literature of 1960s and 1970s; a reason replacing the barbiturates with benzodiazepines when they became available.
