= Relationship evidence =

In law of evidence, relationship evidence describes a particular class of circumstantial evidence, defined in Australian jurisprudence as that which explains the "nature of the relationship between the complainant and the defendant". It provides a context for the offending behavior. Similar to tendency evidence, it establishes the tendency to commit an offence, usually multiple minor instances that often go unreported. The nature of the relationship is often obtained from witnesses who are extraneous to the offences charged. Another form of relationship evidence relates to the establishment of a relationship for the purposes of claiming a benefit of some kind.

== Admissibility ==
The admissibility of this type of evidence derives from common law principles that stand outside the direct operation of the Uniform Evidence Acts ("UEA").

== Other types ==
A different form of relationship evidence is used to establish a relationship for the purposes of obtaining some form of government benefit. In this case the best proof of relationship is a certified copy of the civil or religious birth record of the person filing for benefits showing the parents' names. When the relationship involves a legally adopted child or the parent of a legally adopted child, the best proof is a certified copy of the decree or order of adoption.
