= Evidence-based toxicology =

Evaluation based on data collection and analysis

The discipline of evidence-based toxicology (EBT) strives to transparently, consistently, and objectively assess available scientific evidence in order to answer questions in toxicology, the study of the adverse effects of chemical, physical, or biological agents on living organisms and the environment, including the prevention and amelioration of such effects. EBT has the potential to address concerns in the toxicological community about the limitations of current approaches to assessing the state of the science. These include concerns related to transparency in decision making, synthesis of different types of evidence, and the assessment of bias and credibility. Evidence-based toxicology has its roots in the larger movement towards evidence-based practices.

By analogy to evidence-based medicine (EBM), the umbrella term evidence-based toxicology (EBT) has been coined to group all approaches intended to better implement the above-mentioned evidence-based principles in toxicology in general and in toxicological decision-making in particular. Besides systematic reviews, the core evidence-based tool, such approaches include inter alia the establishment and universal use of a common ontology, justified design and rigorous conduct of studies, consistently structured and detailed reporting of experimental evidence, probabilistic uncertainty and risk assessment, and the development of synthesis methodology to integrate evidence from diverse evidence streams, e.g. from human observational studies, animal studies, in vitro studies and in silico modeling. A main initial impetus for translating evidence-based approaches to toxicology was the need to improve the performance assessment of toxicological test methods. The U.S. National Research Council (NRC) concurs that new means of assessment are needed to keep pace with recent advances in the development of toxicological test methods, capitalizing on enhanced scientific understanding through modern biochemistry and molecular biology.

A key tool in evidence-based medicine that holds promise for EBT is the systematic review. Historically, authors of reviews assessing the results of toxicological studies on a particular topic have searched, selected, and weighed the scientific evidence in a non-systematic and non-transparent way. Due to their narrative nature, these reviews tend to be subjective, potentially biased, and not readily reproducible. Two examples highlighting these deficiencies are the risk assessments of trichloroethylene and bisphenol A (BPA). Twenty-seven different risk assessments of the evidence that trichloroethylene causes cancer have come to substantially different conclusions. Assessments of BPA range from low risk of harm to the public to potential risks (for some populations), leading to different political decisions. Systematic reviews can help reducing such divergent views. In contrast with narrative reviews, they reflect a highly structured approach to reviewing and synthesizing the scientific literature while limiting bias. The steps to carrying out a systematic review include framing the question to be addressed; identifying and retrieving relevant studies; determining if any retrieved studies should be excluded from the analysis; and appraising the included studies in terms of their methodological quality and risk of bias. Ultimately the data should be synthesized across studies, if possible by a meta-analysis. A protocol of how the review will be conducted is prepared ahead of time and ideally should be registered and/or published.

Scientists have made progress in their efforts to apply the systematic review framework to evaluating the evidence for associations between environmental toxicants and human health risks. To date, researchers have shown that important elements of the framework established in evidence-based medicine can be adapted to toxicology with little change, and some studies have been attempted. Researchers using the systematic review methodology to address toxicological concerns include a group of scientists from government, industry, and academia in North America and the European Union (EU) who have joined together to promote evidence-based approaches to toxicology through the nonprofit Evidence-based Toxicology Collaboration (EBTC). The EBTC brings together the international toxicology community to develop EBT methodology and facilitate the use of EBT to inform regulatory, environmental and public health.

== Background ==
Evidence-based approaches were first conceived as a means of anchoring policy decisions, not to current practices or the beliefs of experts, but to experimental evidence. Evidence-based medicine (EBM) was launched slightly later. Its rise as a distinct discipline is generally credited to the work and advocacy of Scottish epidemiologist Archie Cochrane. The Cochrane Collaboration named in his honor was launched at Oxford University in 1993 to promote evidence-based reviews of clinical medical literature. More recently, EBM expanded to encompass evidence-based health care (EBHC).

EBM/HC involves the conscientious, explicit, and judicious use of current best evidence in making decisions about the care of individual patients taking patients' preferences into account. Prior to EBM, medical decisions about diagnosis, prevention, treatment or harm were often made without a rigorous evaluation of the alternatives. Research in the 1970s and 1980s showed that different physicians regularly recommended different treatments and tests for patients with ailments that were essentially the same, and that large proportions of procedures being performed by physicians were considered inappropriate by the standards of medical experts. EBM/HC supporters stress that while evidence always has been important to the practice of medicine, EBM/HC provides an enhanced approach of identifying, assessing, and summarizing evidence. EBT's supporters make a similar argument.

The idea of translating evidence-based approaches from medicine to toxicology has been percolating for two decades, with proponents in both medicine and toxicology. Three research papers published in 2005 and 2006 catalyzed what eventually became known as EBT by suggesting that EBM's established tools and concepts might serve as a prototype of evidence-based decision-making in toxicology.

== Process and progress ==
The First International Forum Toward Evidence-Based Toxicology was held in 2007. The forum was organized by the European Commission and attended by 170 scientists from more than 25 European, American, and Asian countries. The goal was to explore the available concepts of EBT, and to launch an initiative to formally implement evidence-based assessment methods in toxicology.

The starting point for the discussions were two research papers suggesting that the tools and concepts established in evidence-based medicine could serve as a prototype of evidence-based decision-making for evaluating toxicological data. Apparent fundamental differences between medicine and toxicology were carefully considered during these discussions. Forum participants attempted to bridge the two disciplines in order to make use of the accrued wisdom and apply this approach to toxicology. (See .)

The proceedings of this forum were published as a special issue in Human & Experimental Toxicology.

EBT's proponents include experts in EBM, public health, and toxicology who believe that EBT can help toxicologists to better serve the goals of health protection and safety assurance. They argue that EBT's methodologies for collecting, appraising, and pooling evidence can help ensure that all available information on a given topic is evaluated in a transparent, unbiased, and reproducible manner. They contend that EBT's concept of the systematic review could prove particularly helpful for the standardization and quality assurance of novel methodologies for evaluating toxicity, as well as for their formal validation. In this regard, EBT may prove particularly useful for assessing the performance of newer non-animal "21st century" toxicology tools. EBT can also help scientists integrate new toxicological test methods into test strategies being implemented across the globe.

In 2010, a group of EBT supporters joined together to convene a workshop titled "21st Century Validation for 21st Century Tools". The session on the potential for evidence-based approaches to assess the performance of the new generation of non-animal test methods inspired the formation of the EBTC. The EBTC was officially launched in the U.S. in 2011 at a Society of Toxicology conference and convened its first workshop in 2012. The EBTC's EU branch was officially opened during the 2012 Eurotox conference.

In 2014, the EBTC hosted a workshop on "The Emergence of Systematic Review and Related Evidence-based Approaches in Toxicology" with speakers representing US and European organizations that are implementing and promoting the use of systematic reviews for toxicological questions. The experts noted that the structured approach of systematic reviews increases objectivity and transparency but also made clear that the approach requires a substantial time investment, which is a challenge to its more widespread adoption. Consequently, the participants called for close collaboration of interested organizations, which they determined to be a pre-requisite for the broad and efficient introduction of systematic reviews in toxicology.

== Applications of EBT ==
=== Regulatory decision-making ===
Some scientists and policymakers would like EBT to help them combine information from various sources. Toxicological evidence can be assigned to evidence streams, sets of studies representing the same type or level of evidence, such as human (observational) studies, animal studies, in vitro or mechanistic studies. EBT can be applied both within one evidence stream, and it is especially well-suited to be applied across multiple evidence streams. Regulators often designate one study as "the lead study", then use later studies as additional information. Many perceive this as unsatisfying, but objective approaches to combine study results are lacking. The EBM concept of the systematic review has promise for this application, and some structured reviews serve as forerunners for this approach.

=== Evaluating effects of environmental exposures ===
The U.S. National Toxicology Program's Office of Health Assessment and Translation (OHAT) has started to use systematic review methodology for the program's evaluations. The first systematic review was completed in 2016, reviewing the effects of fluoride on learning and memory in animal studies. OHAT's approach is tailored to its mandate, but its seems especially appropriate for substances with substantial yet conflicting literature, and hence the need for systematic reviews to sort out somewhat confusing situations.

=== Causation ===
One application of EBT focuses on causation. It addresses the challenge of tracing a health effect back to a toxicant, such as lung cancer to smoking. This approach is similar to legal arguments Some experts warn that this approach could increase the evidence burden for proving causation, and thereby increase the difficulty involved in banning toxic substances.

=== Clinical toxicology ===
Practitioners of clinical toxicology, which is concerned with the treatment of patients known to be exposed to toxic substances, are also beginning to use an EBM-style approach. Guidance documents based on this approach have already been published

=== 21st century toxicology ===
The National Research Council's (NRC) landmark 2007 publication, "Toxicity Testing in the 21st Century", has also been an impetus for EBT. EBT provides new tools for assessing test method performance. Also, as the focus of 21st-century toxicology shifts from animal biology to human biology, EBT provides a method for comparatively evaluating the results gleaned from new methods of investigating the effects of chemical exposure.

The Evidence-based Toxicology Collaboration has pioneered a number of projects aimed at applying EBT approaches and systematic reviews to test methods comparison.

== Limitations and challenges ==
The specific differences between toxicology and medicine/health care cause challenges for implementing EBT. Evidence-based methodology of clinical research has been focused on a single type of study—randomized, controlled clinical trials, which are a direct measure of the effectiveness of the health care intervention under scrutiny. In contrast, toxicology employs a variety of different kinds of studies in three distinct evidence streams: human (observational) studies, animal studies, and non-animal studies. Because human evidence is frequently lacking most evidence is obtained by using animal and non-animal models, which—by definition—is more difficult to generalize and extrapolate to humans. This methodological heterogeneity complicates evidence integration within an evidence stream, such as when inconsistent evidence is obtained from different animal species, but even more so across evidence streams. Adding to the difficulty is the reality that much toxicological evidence, more so than in medicine and health care, is not readily accessible in the literature. Moreover, the role of expert judgment, especially in systematic reviews, needs to be clearly defined, as it is a common misperception that evidence-based approaches leave no room for it. Systematic reviews should strive to make expert judgments clear along with the scientific basis for those judgments in developing conclusions for a systematic review. Further issues to be worked out include exposures to multiple substances, the multitude of outcomes observed in some animal studies, and challenges in improving the experimental designs and reporting of studies.

== See also ==
- Evidence-based medicine
- Evidence-based practice
