= John F. Forester =

American planning theorist

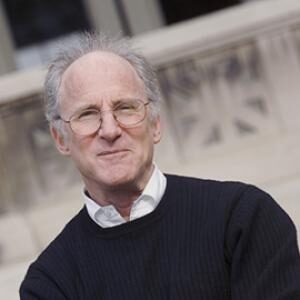
Image of John Forester

John F. Forester is a planning theorist with a particular emphasis on participatory planning. His scholarship appeals moral philosophy, oral history and ethnographic social science, as well as planning and policy studies. He is the author of Critical Theory and Public Life (1987), Planning in the Face of Power (1989), The Deliberative Practitioner (1999) and "Dealing with Differences: Dramas of Mediating Public Disputes" (2009).

== Biography ==
John F. Forester (1948) was educated at the University of California, Berkeley, receiving a BS in 1970 and an MS in 1971, both in Mechanical Engineering. He completed a Master of City Planning in 1974, and a PhD in 1977, also at the University of California. His continued academic interest in planning led to his 1985 edited collection, Critical Theory and Public Life (MIT Press), and later works Planning in the Face of Power (1989, University of California Press), The Deliberative Practitioner (1999, MIT Press) and Dealing with Differences: Dramas of Mediating Public Disputes (2009, Oxford UP). In 1990 he co-authored, with Norman Krumholz, "Making Equity Planning Work: Leadership in the Public Sector" (Temple University Press).

In 1998 Forester was appointed chair of the Department of City and Regional Planning at Cornell University, a position he held until 2001. He has remained with the college as an academic, and has served as associate dean of the College of Architecture, Art, and Planning. He served for 20 years as a mediator for the Community Dispute Resolution Center of Tompkins County, has consulted for the Consensus Building Institute, and has lectured in Seattle, Chapel Hill, Sydney, Melbourne, Helsinki, Palermo, Johannesburg, Brisbane and Aix en Provence.

Forester visited the University of Amsterdam for his sabbatic year, 2008–2009, as the NICIS Professor at the Amsterdam Centre for Conflict and Negotiation, University of Amsterdam (see www.conflictstudies.nl). Since January 2010, he has once again become director of graduate studies in the Department of City and Regional Planning at Cornell University.

In 2013, the American Planning Association published Forester's curated collection of vignette case studies in "Planning in the Face of Conflict: The Surprising Possibilities of Facilitative Leadership."
