= Evidence-based nursing =

Nursing care that integrates science with nursing expertise

Evidence-based nursing (EBN) is an approach to making quality decisions and providing nursing care based upon personal clinical expertise in combination with the most current, relevant research available on the topic. This approach is using evidence-based practice (EBP) as a foundation. EBN implements the most up to date methods of providing care, which have been proven through appraisal of high quality studies and statistically significant research findings. The goal of EBN is to improve the health and safety of patients while also providing care in a cost-effective manner to improve the outcomes for both the patient and the healthcare system. EBN is a process founded on the collection, interpretation, appraisal, and integration of valid, clinically significant, and applicable research. The evidence used to change practice or make a clinical decision can be separated into seven levels of evidence that differ in type of study and level of quality. To properly implement EBN, the knowledge of the nurse, the patient's preferences, and multiple studies of evidence must all be collaborated and utilized in order to produce an appropriate solution to the task at hand. These skills are taught in modern nursing education and also as a part of professional training.

Muriel Skeet, a British nurse, was an early advocate for the development of the evidence base for health care. She produced studies and surveys including Waiting in Outpatients (1965), which received widespread publicity and resulted in the introduction of appointment systems, and Marriage and Nursing (with Gertrude Ramsden, 1967), which resulted in staff creches for nurses.

== Cultivate spirit of inquiry ==
A spirit of inquiry refers to an attitude in which questions are encouraged to be asked about existing practices. Cultivating a spirit of inquiry allows healthcare providers to feel comfortable with questioning current methods of practice and challenging these practices to create improvements and change. A culture that fosters this should have a philosophy that incorporates EBP, access to tools that can enhance EBP, and administrative support and leadership that values EBP.

Key Elements to Foster EBP

1. Always question current practices as nursing professional.
2. Integrate EBP as higher standard/mission/philosophy and include competencies for EBP.
3. EBP mentors for skills and knowledge availability to others to provide and help.
4. Tools to enhance EBP (e.g. meetings, educational/classroom time, access to, etc.).
5. Higher level support and ability for leaders to model valued EBP skills.
6. Recognition of use of EBP often

== Ask clinical question (PICOT) ==
PICOT formatted questions address the patient population (P), issue of interest or intervention (I), comparison group (C), outcome (O), and time frame (T). Asking questions in this format assists in generating a search that produces the most relevant, quality information related to a topic, while also decreasing the amount of time needed to produce these search results.

- An example of an intervention focused PICOT question would be: In total knee arthroplasty patients (Population), what is the effect of nerve blocks (Intervention) compared to opioid pain medication (Comparison) in controlling post-operative pain (Outcome) within the first 24 hours after surgery (Time)?
- An example of an issue of interest focused PICOT question would be: How do post-rehab chronic obstructive pulmonary disease (COPD) patients (Population) with stage 3 (Issue of Interest) perceive their ability to perform activities of daily living (Outcome) after first month (Time) of rehabilitation? [No comparison group].

== Search for and collect relevant evidence ==
To begin the search for evidence, use each keyword from the PICOT question that was formed. Once results have been found on the intervention or treatment, the research can be rated to determine which provides the strongest level of evidence. There are seven levels of evidence, with a level I being of the strongest quality and a level VII being of the weakest quality:

- Level I: Evidence from systematic reviews or meta-analysis of randomized control trials
- Level II: Evidence from well-designed randomized control trials
- Level III: Evidence from well-designed control trials that are not randomized
- Level IV: Evidence from case-control or cohort studies
- Level V: Evidence from systematic reviews of descriptive or qualitative studies
- Level VI: Evidence from a single descriptive or qualitative study
- Level VII: Evidence from expert opinions

The strongest levels of evidence, systematic reviews and meta-analyses, summarize evidence related to a specific topic by finding and assessing studies that specifically relate to the question being asked. Meta-analyses are systematic reviews that also use quantitative measures such as statistics to summarize the results of the studies analyzed.

Pyramid framework. Thinking of the information resources used to obtain evidence as a pyramid can help determine what the most valid and least biased evidence is. The top of the pyramid is just that. This is where decision support can be found, which is found within the medical record. The middle of the pyramid is the reviews of the evidence. This includes systematic reviews, practice guidelines, topic summaries, and article synopses. The bottom of the pyramid is the original studies. The bottom is also considered the foundation of the pyramid and where evidence begins. This includes research articles. Those who look for evidence here need special knowledge and skills to not only find the evidence itself but how to evaluate its worthiness.

== Critically appraise the evidence ==
To begin the critical appraisal process, three questions need to be asked to determine the relevance of evidence and if evidence applies to population being cared for. The three questions are:

1. Are the results of the study valid?
2. What are the results?
3. Will the results be applicable in caring for patients?
- Question 1 measures the validity. In order to be valid, the results of the study must be as close to the truth as possible. Also, the study must be conducted using best available research methods.
- Question 2 measures the reliability of the study. If it is an intervention study, reliability consists of: whether the intervention worked, how large the effect was, and whether a clinician could repeat the study with similar results. If it is a qualitative study, reliability would be measured by determining if the research accomplished the purpose of the study.
- Question 3 measures the applicability. The study may be used in practice when caring for patients if the subjects are similar to the patients being cared for, the benefit outweighs the harm, the study is feasible, and the patient desires the treatment.

After asking these three questions, evidence appraisal continues by creating an evidence synthesis. This synthesis compares multiple studies to see if they are in agreement with each other.

== Integrate the evidence ==
After appraising the evidence, it is necessary to integrate it with the provider's expertise and patient's preferences. The patient is encouraged to practice autonomy and participate in the decision-making process. Therefore, even if the study had successful outcomes, the patient may refuse to receive a treatment. Assessment findings and patient history may reveal further contraindications to a certain evidence-based treatment. Lastly, availability of healthcare resources may limit the implementation of a treatment even if it is found to be effective in a study.

== Evaluate outcomes ==
The next step in the evidence-based practice process is to evaluate whether the treatment was effective in terms of patient outcomes. It is important to evaluate the outcomes in a real-world clinical setting to determine the impact of the evidence-based change on healthcare quality.

== Disseminate outcomes ==
The last step is to share the information especially if positive outcomes are achieved. By sharing the results of evidence-based practice process, others may benefit. Some methods to disseminate the information include presentations at conferences, rounds within one's own institution, and journal publications.

== Qualitative research process ==
One method of research for evidence-based practice in nursing is 'qualitative research': The word implies an entity and meanings that are not experimentally examined or measured in terms of quantity, amount, frequency, or intensity. With qualitative research, researchers learn about patient experiences through discussions and interviews. The point of qualitative research is to provide beneficial descriptions that allow insight into patient experiences. "Hierarchies of research evidence traditionally categorize evidence from weakest to strongest, with an emphasis on support for the effectiveness of interventions. That this perspective tends to dominate the evidence-based practice literature makes the merit of qualitative research unclear;" ^{1} Some people view qualitative research as less beneficial and effective, with its lack of numbers, the fact that it is "feeling-based" research, makes the opponents associate it with bias. Nevertheless, the ability to empathetically understand an individual's experience (whether it be with cancer, pressure ulcers, trauma, etc.), can benefit not only other patients, but the health care workers providing care.

For qualitative research to be reliable, the testing must be unbiased. To achieve this, researchers must use random and non-random samples to obtain concise information about the topic being studied. If available, a control group should be in use, if possible with the qualitative studies that are done. Evidence should be gathered from every available subject within the sample to create balance and dissolve any bias. There should also be several researchers doing the interviewing to obtain different perspectives about the subject. Researchers must also obtain negative information as well as the positive information gathered to support the data. This will help to show the researchers were unbiased and were not trying to hide negative results from readers, and actually makes it possible to objectively understand the phenomenon under investigation. The inclusion of this negative information will strengthen the researchers' initial study, and may actually work in favor to support the hypothesis. Any data that has been gathered must be appropriately documented. If the data collected was obtained from interviews or observation, it must all be included. Dates, times and gender of the sample may be needed, providing background on subjects, such as breast cancer in women over thirty-five. Any pertinent information pertaining to the sample must be included for the reader to judge the study as worthy.

In addition, the current evidence-based practice (EBP) movement in healthcare emphasizes that clinical decision making should be based on the "best evidence" available, preferably the findings of randomized clinical trials. Within this context qualitative research findings are considered to have little value and the old debate in nursing has been re-ignited related as to whether qualitative versus quantitative research findings provides the best empirical evidence for nursing practice. In response to this crisis qualitative scholars have been called upon by leaders in the field to clarify for outsiders what qualitative research is and to be more explicit in pointing out the utility of qualitative research findings. In addition, attention to "quality" in qualitative research has been identified as an area worthy of renewed focus. Within this paper two key problems related to addressing these issues are reviewed: disagreement not only among "outsiders" but also some nursing scholars related to the definition of "qualitative research", and a lack of consensus related how to best address "rigor" in this type of inquiry.

Based on this review a set of standard requirements for qualitative research published in nursing journals is proposed that reflects a uniform definition of qualitative research and an enlarged yet clearly articulated conceptualization of quality. The approach suggested provides a framework for developing and evaluating qualitative research that would have both defensible scholarly merit and heuristic value. This will help solidify the argument in favor of incorporating qualitative research findings as part of the empirical "evidence" upon which evidence-based nursing is founded.

== Legal and ethical issues of research ==
Both legal and ethical issues are important in considering patient-based research. The American Nurses Association (ANA) has set up five basic rights for patient protection:

1. Right to self-determination
2. Right to privacy and dignity
3. Right to anonymity and confidentiality
4. Right to fair treatment
5. Right to protection from discomfort and harm.

These rights apply to both researchers and participants. Informed consent is one area that nurses must be familiar with in order to complete research. Informed consent is "the legal principle that governs the patient's ability to accept or reject individual medical interventions designed to diagnose or treat an illness". Informed consent can only be obtained before the procedure and after potential risks have been explained to the participant. When dealing with the ethical portion of evidence-based practice, the Institutional Review Boards (IRB) review research projects to assess that ethical standards are being followed. The institutional review board is responsible for protecting subjects from risk and loss of personal rights and dignity. The IRB also come into play when deciding on which populations can be included in research. Vulnerable groups such as children, pregnant women, physically disabled or elderly maybe excluded from the process. Nurses must notify the IRB of any ethical or legal violations.

It is important to be up to date on all the appropriate state laws and regulations regarding vulnerable populations. This may mean consulting with lawyers, clinicians, ethicists, as well as the affiliated IRB. It is imperative that researchers act as advocates for these vulnerable persons that cannot do so for themselves.

== Barriers to promoting evidence-based practice ==
The use of evidence-based practice depends a great deal on the nursing student's proficiency at understanding and critiquing the research articles and the associated literature that will be presented to them in the clinical setting. According to, Blythe Royal, author of Promoting Research Utilization in nursing: The Role of the Individual, Organization, and Environment, a large amount of the preparation requirements of nursing students consists of creating care plans for patients, covering in depth processes of pathophysiology, and retaining the complex information of pharmacology. These are indeed very important for the future of patient care, but their knowledge must consist of more when they begin to practice. Evidence-based nursing in an attempt to facilitate the management of the growing literature and technology accessible to healthcare providers that can potentially improve patient care and their outcomes. Nancy Dickenson-Hazard states, "Nurses have the capacity to serve as caregivers and change agents in creating and implementing community and population-focused health systems." There is also a need to overcome the barriers to encourage the use of research by new graduates in an attempt to ensure familiarity with the process. This will help nurses to feel more confident and be more willing to engage in evidence-based nursing. A survey that was established by the Honor Society of Nursing and completed by registered nurses proved that 69% have only a low to moderate knowledge of EBP and half of those that responded did not feel sure of the steps in the process. Many responded, "lack of time during their shift is the primary challenge to researching and applying EBP." There is always and will always be a desire to improve the care of our patients. The ever-increasing cost of healthcare and the need for more accuracy in the field proves a cycle in need of evidence-based healthcare. The necessity to overcome the current issues is to gain knowledge from a variety of literature not just the basics. There is a definite need for nurses, and all practitioners, to have an open mind when dealing with the modern inventions of the future because these could potentially improve the health of patients.

There are many barriers to promoting evidence-based practice. The first of which would be the practitioner's ability to critically appraise research. This includes having a considerable amount of research evaluation skills, access to journals, and clinic/hospital support to spend time on EBN. Time, workload pressures, and competing priorities can impede research and development. The causes of these barriers include nurses' and other professional practitioners' lack of knowledge of research methods, lack of support from professional colleagues and organizations, and lack of confidence and authority in the research arena. Another barrier is that the practice environment can be resistant to changing tried and true conventional methods of practice. This can be caused because of reluctance to believe results of research study over safe, traditional practices, cost of adopting new practices, or gaining momentum to rewrite existing protocols. It is important to show nurses who may be resistant to changes in nursing practice the benefits that nurses, their patients, and their institutions can reap from the implementation of evidence-based nursing practice, which is to provide better nursing care. Values, resources and evidence are the three factors that influence decision-making with regard to health care. All registered nurses and health care professionals should be taught to read and critically interpret research and know where to find articles which relate to their field of care. In addition, nurses need to be more aware of how to assess the information and determine its applicability to their practice.

Another barrier to implementing EBN into practice is lack of continuing education programs. Practices do not have the means to provide workshops to teach new skills due to lack of funding, staff, and time; therefore, the research may be tossed dismissed. If this occurs, valuable treatments may never be utilized in patient care. Not only will the patients suffer but the staff will not have the opportunity to learn a new skill. Also, the practitioners may not be willing to implement change regardless of the benefits to patient care.

Another barrier to introducing newly learned methods for improving treatments or patients' health is the fear of "stepping on one's toes". New nurses might feel it is not their place to suggest or even tell a superior nurse that newer, more efficient methods and/or practices are available.

Even if clinicians do act consistently it is possible that their decisions are consistently biased. People put different values on gains and losses. Tversky and Kahneman gave people the two identical problems (with the same probabilities of life and death outcomes – see fig 1) but framed the outcome choices as either lives saved or as deaths.10 Most people wanted to avoid taking risks with gains which could be safeguarded, but would take risks with losses which might be avoided; this is a framing effect. If people are given identical options but different words are used to emphasize a gain rather than a loss, then a different response is given by a large proportion of the population under study. Such a change in response appears to be inconsistent.

== Implementation and sustainability ==
The Iowa Model is used to promote quality of care. It is a guideline for nurses in their decision-making process. The decision making can include clinical and administration practices. These practices affect patient outcomes. The model is based on problem-solving steps that are a part of the scientific process. Recognition for applicability and ease of use. Key components of using the Iowa Model:

1. Identify "triggers"
2. Clinical applications
3. Organizational priorities
4. Forming a team
5. Piloting a practice change
6. Evaluating the pilot
7. Evaluate change and share results
- First, identify "triggers", which can be either problem focused or knowledge focused. These can be the important questions that arise from current practices. With knowledge focus, nurses can question a current practice due to shared scientific knowledge. This knowledge can be in the form of research or national guidelines for example. With problem focus, nurses can find room for improvement from already existing facts.
- Second, clinical application is how nurses figure out the importance of the question identified and the relevance by using the EBP process.
- Third, organizational priorities is ranking the question by the priorities of the organization. High priority given to areas that focus on high-volume/risk/cost, organization's plan, or motivated by other forces. Knowing where a question lies in priorities can be a determination factor of getting the necessities needed to do an EBP projection for that organization.
- Fourth, forming a team is possible once agreeance occurs. The team is assembled to create, do, and evaluate the change. It is a multi-disciplinary functioning team with various skill sets and networks.
- Fifth, the piloting of a practice change is the essential step to this process. Having a selected area of the organization to pilot the practice change can help identify any issues that arise from implementation of the change before the change is spread throughout the organization. This is a multiple step process.
- Sixth, the evaluation of the pilot is the decision-making process that evaluates if the pilot is accomplishing the goals of implementation, which is the quality of care provided improving, due to this pilot or not. It can involve either problem solving of the issues being had, dropping the implementation completely/postponing, or going ahead and implementing.
- Lastly, the EBP changes continued to be monitored with reports of quality and performance improvements being noted. Sharing the results with the rest of the organization is key for learning. It also promotes the EBP culture.

== See also ==
- Evidence-based practices

https://www.varhealthcare.com/
