= Evidence-based legislation =

Decisions and practices that use evidence to enact laws

Evidence-based legislation (EBL) is a legislative concept which calls for the use of the best available scientific evidence and systematically collected data, when available, by legislatures as a basis for their formulation and writing of law. Evidence-based legislation has its roots in the larger movement towards evidence-based practices, and depends on multiple other factors, including evidence gathering, qualitative and quantitative data analyses, stakeholder assessments, expert input, cost-benefit analyses, and continued monitoring and equation.

== Overview ==
This concept was originally mentioned at a conference entitled "At the Margins. A Conference on Sex Offender Management in Minnesota 2006. Policy and Management Options for the Most Dangerous Sex Offenders" by Gerald T. Kaplan, a psychologist. This conference was organized by Eric Janus, Esq. Vice-Dean, the William Mitchell College of Law, and was held on February 24, 2006, in Minneapolis, Minnesota. The conference was devoted to considerations of policy involving management of dangerous sex offenders. It was noted that much of the legislation involving sex offenders that has been passed has been done so by legislatures reacting to public sentiment and fear, without the interposition of rational consideration of policy options and of policy consequences. Given the evolving standard of evidence-based medicine, and because policies regarding sex offenders often involve medical and psychological care, it was suggested that a similar standard of care be articulated for legislatures for the formation of legislation affecting sex offenders. This concept and standard could well be applied to other areas of legislation, but are most needed where there is an impetus to pass legislation quickly in reaction to emotionally charged events, such as publicized sex crimes.

== History ==
This concept is new and an exhaustive search of the legal and encyclopedic literature has not revealed any references to it until recently. This concept is first cited in the legal literature by Shajnfeld and Krueger (p 96). The irrational nature of sex offender legislation passed to date is described in this article as well as in a book by Jenkins, and the concept of "evidence-based legislation" is one suggestion to remedy the continuing passage of reactive, emotionally based, legislation to manage sex offenders and reduce sexual crime, which often has not been well conceived or well planned, and where little thought has been given to its economic and practical consequences.

This concept was also mentioned in an op-ed in the Los Angeles Times on March 11, 2007, entitled "The new American witch hunt" by Richard B. Krueger, M.D.

== See also ==
- Evidence-based policing
- Evidence-based policy
- Evidence-based practices
