= HCR =

HCR may refer to:

== Transportation ==
=== Airports ===
- Holy Cross Airport, in Alaska, United States

=== Railways ===
- Hawaii Consolidated Railway
- Honey Creek Railroad

== Companies and organizations ==
- HCR Corporation, Canadian software company of the 1970s and 1980s
- Hollywood Congress of Republicans
- Huntingdon Community Radio, in Huntingdonshire, England
- United Nations High Commissioner for Refugees
- HCR Manor Care, a healthcare organization
- Household Cavalry Regiment, a unit of the British Army
- High Class Racing, a Danish auto racing team

== Science and technology ==
=== Academia ===
- A Highly Cited Researcher

=== Biology and medicine ===
- Herbal Cannabis Reef
- Health care reform
- Host-Cell Reactivation
- Human cognitive reliability correlation

=== Statistics and computing ===
- Head count ratio
- UTRA-TDD HCR, a telecommunication standard
- Home Condition Report, a proposed part of the Home Information Pack

== Entertainment and media ==
- Hill Climb Racing, video game
- Hot Chelle Rae, an American pop band
- Hot Club Records, a Norwegian record label
- Hover Car Racer, a 2004 novel

== Other uses ==
- Heather Cox Richardson, an American historian
- House concurrent resolution, in the United States Congress
