= Campbell's law =

Adage about perverse incentives

Campbell's law is an adage developed by American psychologist and social scientist Donald T. Campbell, who often wrote about research methodology. The adage states:

The more any quantitative social indicator is used for social decision-making, the more subject it will be to corruption pressures and the more apt it will be to distort and corrupt the social processes it is intended to monitor.

== Applications ==
Campbell's law is related to the cobra effect, which is the sometimes unintended negative effect of public policy and other government interventions in economics, commerce, and healthcare.

=== Education ===
In 1976, Campbell wrote: "Achievement tests may well be valuable indicators of general school achievement under conditions of normal teaching aimed at general competence. But when test scores become the goal of the teaching process, they both lose their value as indicators of educational status and distort the educational process in undesirable ways. (Similar biases of course surround the use of objective tests in courses or as entrance examinations.)"

The social science principle of Campbell's law is used to point out the negative consequences of high-stakes testing in U.S. classrooms. This may take the form of teaching to the test or outright cheating. "The High-Stakes Education Rule" is identified and analyzed in the book Measuring Up: What Educational Testing Really Tells Us.

Campbell's law has been used in criticism of Race to the Top, an Obama administration program, and the No Child Left Behind Act, enacted during the George W. Bush Administration.

== Similar rules ==
There are closely related ideas known by different names, such as Goodhart's law and the Lucas critique. Another concept related to Campbell's law emerged in 2006 when UK researchers Rebecca Boden and Debbie Epstein published an analysis of evidence-based policy, a practice espoused by Prime Minister Tony Blair. In the paper, Boden and Epstein described how a government that tries to base its policy on evidence can actually end up producing corrupted data because it "seeks to capture and control the knowledge producing processes to the point where this type of 'research' might best be described as 'policy-based evidence'."

When someone distorts decisions in order to improve the performance measure, they often surrogate, coming to believe that the measure is a better measure of true performance than it really is.

Campbell's law imparts a more positive but complicated message. It is important to measure progress making use of quantitative and qualitative indicators. However, using quantitative data for evaluation can distort and manipulate these indicators. Concrete measures must be adopted to reduce alteration and manipulation of information. In his article "Assessing the Impact of Planned Social Change", Campbell emphasized that "the more any quantitative social indicator is used for social decision-making, the more subject it will be to corruption pressures and the more apt it will be to distort and corrupt the social processes it is intended to monitor."

== See also ==
- Goodhart's law – Adage about statistical measures (Strathern variant)
- Perverse incentive – Incentive with unintended results
- The purpose of a system is what it does – Systems thinking heuristic
- Lucas critique – 1970s paradigm shift in economic thought, named for American economist Robert Lucas
- Reflexivity (social theory) – Circular relationships between cause and effect
- Proxy (statistics) – Variable used in place of another variable
- Observer effect (physics) – Fact that observing a situation changes it
