= Meta-regulation =

Meta-regulation is a form of regulation that encourages self-regulation of firms. In contrast to traditional forms of regulation, where decisions concerning rules are decided by the regulator, meta-regulation has firms create their own rules while observing and monitoring those rules. The advantages of self-regulation are that devolved structures of regulation allow for greater learning in complex and uncertain environments. Firms with the potential for catastrophic failure such as finance, oil drilling, mining, manufacturing, etc. often desire effective regulation to prevent such failures because of cost and damaged public relations.

Meta-regulation is said to have the advantage of fostering norms of reflexivity among institutions, as they are forced to conscientiously consider optimal levels of regulation and elucidate the reasoning to regulators. In an ideal world of meta-regulation the motivations for both regulators and regulates become the same by diffusing the norms of safety and stability. Meta-regulation in practice has been critiqued as relying too heavily on notions of consensus and rationality (see Simon, 2017)

Sources on Meta-regulation:
