= Policy-based evidence making =

Pejorative term in public administration

"Policy-based evidence making" is a pejorative term which refers to the commissioning of research in order to support a policy which has already been decided upon. It is the converse of evidence-based policy making.

As the name suggests, policy-based evidence making means working back from a predefined policy to produce underpinning evidence. Working from a conclusion to provide only supporting evidence is an approach which contradicts most interpretations of the scientific method; however, it should be distinguished from research into the effects of a policy where such research may provide either supporting or opposing evidence.

== Examples ==
In The Politics of Evidence: From evidence-based policy to the good governance of evidence, Justin Parkhurst quotes the following example from Professor Anne Glover, then Chief Scientific Officer to the European Commission:

Let's imagine a Commissioner over the weekend thinks, "Let's ban the use of credit cards in the EU because credit cards lead to personal debt". So that commissioner will come in on Monday morning and say to his or her Director General, "Find me the evidence that demonstrates that this is the case".

Similar reasoning has been advanced in respect of public policy on alcohol and narcotics.

== Mentions ==
In July 2006, Rebecca Boden and Debbie Epstein published a paper in which they wrote:

This need [for evidence] has been reified in the UK and elsewhere, as routines of "evidence-based policy"-making have been hardwired into the business of Government. Intuitively, basing policies that affect people's lives and the economy on rigorous academic research sounds rational and desirable. However, such approaches are fundamentally flawed by virtue of the fact that Government, in its broadest sense, seeks to capture and control the knowledge producing processes to the point where this type of "research" might best be described as "policy-based evidence".

The term "policy-based evidence making" was later referred to in a report of the United Kingdom House of Commons Select Committee on Science and Technology into Scientific Advice, Risk and Evidence Based Policy Making issued in October 2006. The committee stated:

[Ministers] should certainly not seek selectively to pick pieces of evidence which support an already agreed policy, or even commission research in order to produce a justification for policy: so-called "policy-based evidence making" (see paragraphs 95–6). Where there is an absence of evidence, or even when the Government is knowingly contradicting the evidence—maybe for very good reason—this should be openly acknowledged. [emphasis in original]

The term has been applied to climate policy. Oliver Geden, writing in Nature in 2015, said (p. 28):

Everyday politics is therefore dominated not by evidence-based policy-making but by attempts at 'policy-based evidence-making'.

The term has also been applied outside the strictly scientific arena, for example in a position paper for the Arts and Humanities Research Council.

== See also ==
- Campbell's law – Adage about perverse incentives
- Goodhart's law – Adage about statistical measures
- Inverse benefit law – Drug benefit-harm ratio falls with marketing
- Politicization of science – Use of science for political purposes
- Woozle effect – False credibility due to quantity of citations
