= Charles Goodhart =

British economist

Charles A. E. Goodhart
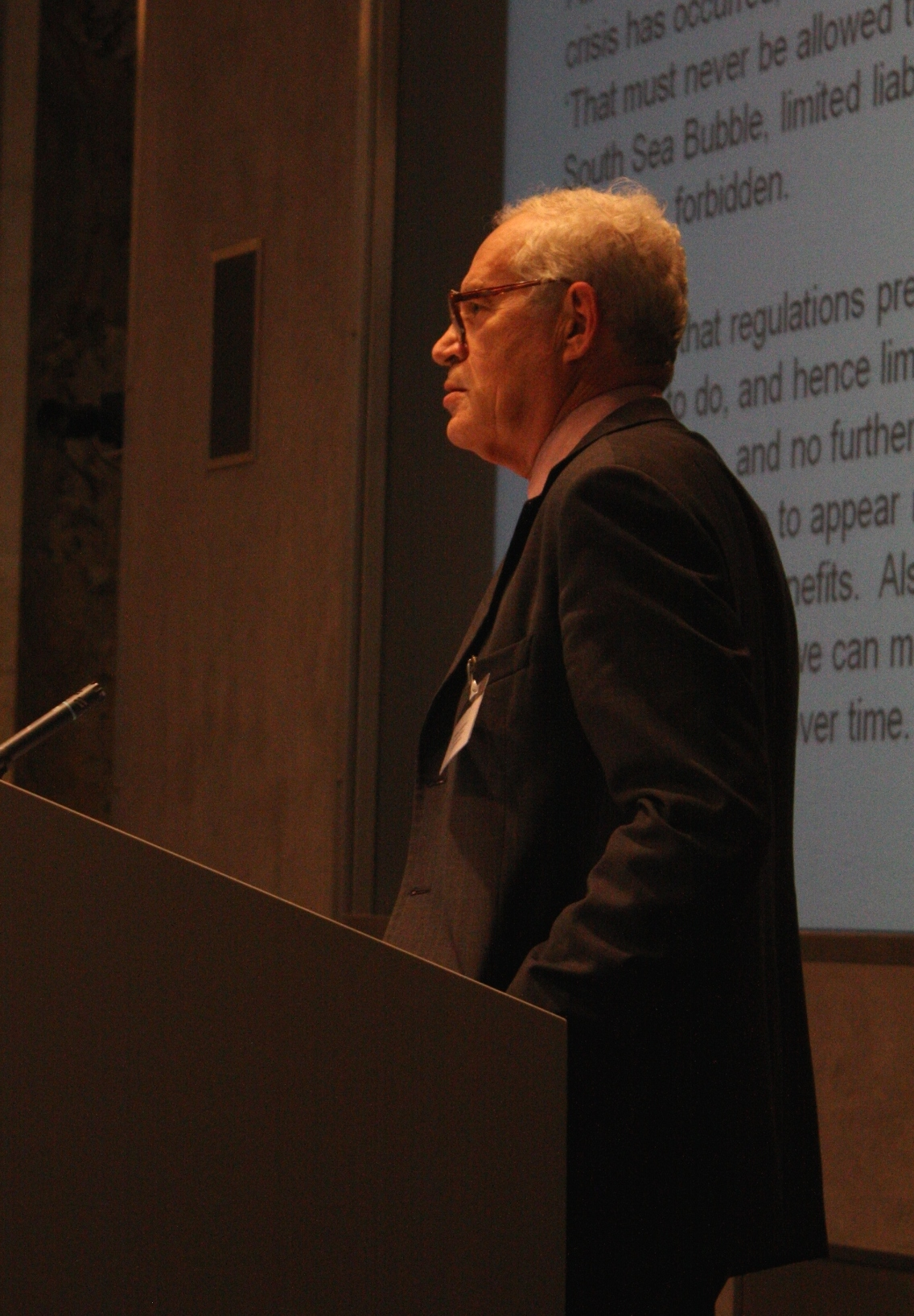
- Goodhart delivers the keynote address during the 2012 Long Finance conference in London.
- Born: 23 October 1936 (age 90)
- Parent(s): Arthur Lehman Goodhart (father); Cecily Goodhart (née Carter) (mother)

Academic background
- Education: Trinity College, Cambridge; Harvard University

Academic work
- Institutions: University of Cambridge; Department of Economic Affairs; London School of Economics; Bank of England; Hong Kong Exchange Fund
- Notable ideas: Goodhart's law

Charles Albert Eric Goodhart, CBE, FBA (born 23 October 1936) is a British economist. He worked at the Bank of England on its public policy from 1968 to 1985, and worked at the London School of Economics from 1966 to 1968 and 1986 to 2002. His work focuses on central bank governance practices and monetary frameworks. He also conducted academic research into foreign exchange markets. He is best known for formulating Goodhart's law, which states: "When a measure becomes a target, it ceases to be a good measure."

== Early life and education ==
Charles Goodhart was born on 23 October 1936 in Oxford, England, to Arthur Lehman Goodhart, an American residing in England, and his English wife, Cecily Carter. His father studied law at Trinity College, Cambridge, eventually becoming a law don at Corpus Christi College. Following the family's move to Oxford, Goodhart's father became the Professor of Jurisprudence in 1936 and the Master of University College (1951–1963). While their father was Jewish, Cecily Carter brought up her three sons (Philip Goodhart, William Goodhart and Charles Goodhart) as members of the Church of England. During World War II, Arthur Goodhart's outspoken opposition to Nazism led to Charles (aged 2) being evacuated alongside his two elder brothers to the United States. Upon their return, Charles joined his brother William Goodhart at the St Leonards branch of the (Oxford) Summerfields School. Charles was then accepted to Eton College where he focused on the study of history and languages. After he finished school, he completed two years of compulsory national military service (1955–1956) in which he was involved with the Hungarian Revolution of 1956 and the Suez Crisis and earned the rank of second lieutenant in the King's Royal Rifle Corps.

=== Cambridge (1957–1965) ===
In October 1957, Goodhart started studying economics at the University of Cambridge, where he was a member of his father's college, Trinity. In his first year, he came first in his course. He learnt under economists such as Nicky Kaldor, Richard Kahn, Joan Robinson, Michael Farrell, Frank Hahn and Robin Matthews. In his final year of study, he was paired in supervisions with James Mirrlees. He completed his undergraduate course with first-class honours. After completing his undergraduate degree at Cambridge, Goodhart moved to the United States in 1960 to begin research at Harvard University studying trade cycles. In June 1962, following the completion of his doctoral thesis, which analysed United States monetary history (specifically why the economy rebounded in 1907 but not in 1929), Goodhart and his new wife travelled back to Cambridge. He took up a Prize Fellowship at Trinity College and became an assistant lecturer in economics (1963–1964). He spent the next two years interpreting English monetary history by cumulating and analysing the monthly reports of the London Joint Stock Banks, which were published after the Baring crisis of 1890.

=== London School of Economics (1966–1968) ===
In 1964, Goodhart briefly joined the Department of Economic Affairs. During this time, he worked on white papers, planning the growth of the energy, construction and housing sectors in England. Goodhart left the Department of Economic Affairs in 1966 when he joined the London School of Economics as a lecturer on monetary policy. During this time, he contributed to a study on English monetary policy "Monetary Policy in Twelve Industrial Countries", which was commissioned by the federal Reserve Bank of Boston. He also co-authored an article in the field of political economy alongside R.J. Bhansali, which featured in the journal Political Studies. He stayed at the London School of Economics until 1968.

== Career ==
=== Bank of England (1968–1985) ===
Goodhart left the London School of Economics to work a temporary two-year assignment at the Bank of England. He found his expertise in monetary economics and his knowledge of Milton Friedman's ideas to be of high value. He was allocated to the Economic Intelligence Department, which was responsible for calculating and simulating economic statistics as well as writing the Bank of England's Quarterly Bulletin. His first job at the Bank of England was to explain the concept of domestic credit expansion to individuals within the Bank, while conveying the Bank's viewpoints on such issues to outside economists. In 1970, he was tasked with empirically assessing the predictability of the demand for money, and had the results published in the Bank of England's Quarterly Bulletin in a paper called "The Importance of Money". During this time, Goodhart served as the first secretary of the Monetary Review Committee, who provided summarised views of monetary developments to the Chancellor of the Exchequer and HM Treasury.

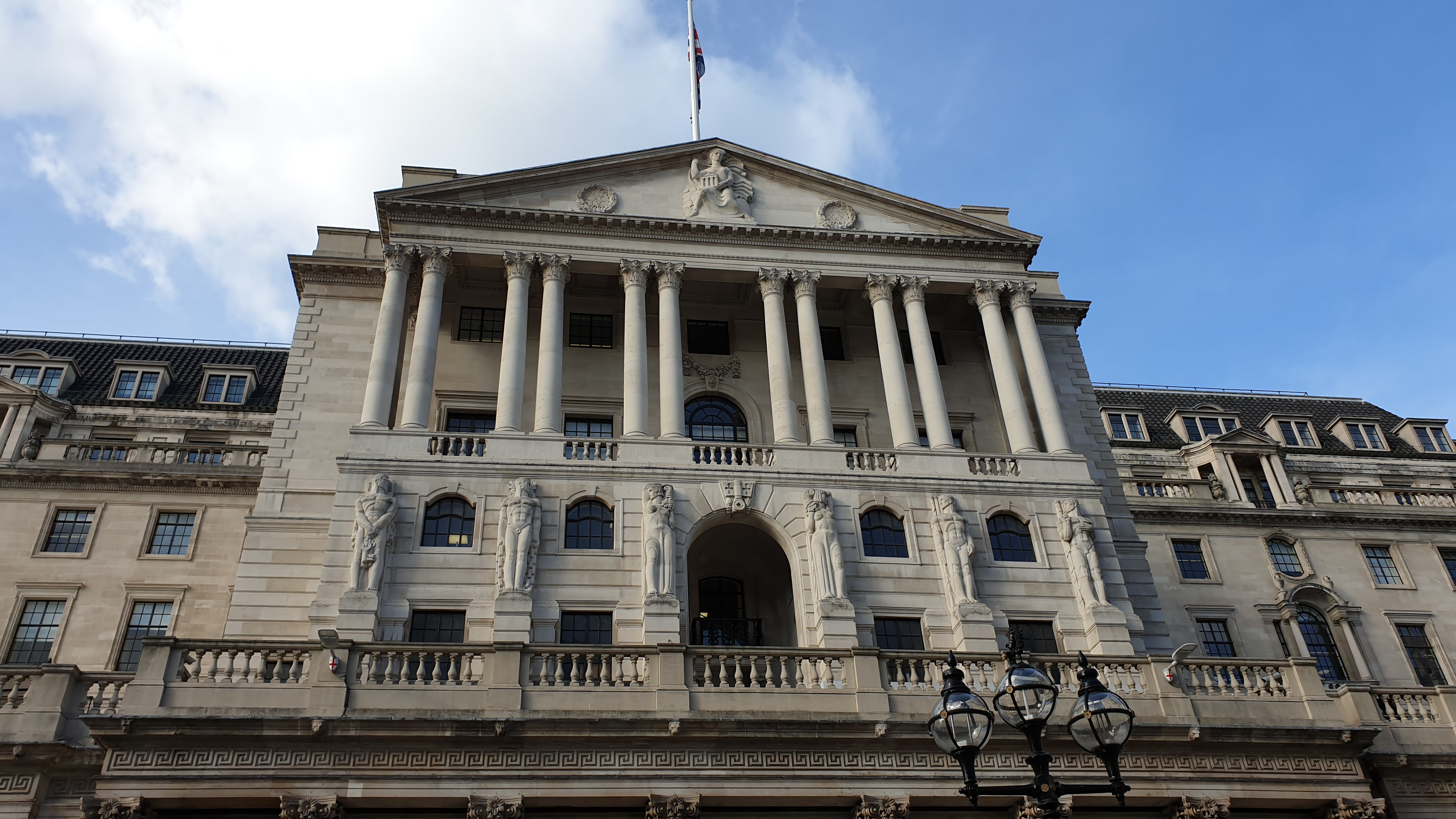
The Bank of England - London, United Kingdom (2021)

While attending a conference held by the Reserve Bank of Australia in 1975, Goodhart wrote in his footnotes "whenever a government seeks to rely on a previously observed statistical regularity for control purposes, that regularity will collapse". This quote became known as Goodhart's law; it is commonly expressed as: "When a measure becomes a target, it ceases to be a good measure". In 1979, Goodhart jointly wrote a paper, which was published in the Bank of England's Quarterly Bulletin. It advised the new Thatcher government against implementing monetary base control. In the early 1980s, Goodhart joined the home finance division of the Bank of England, under John Fforde. In 1980, he was promoted to Senior Adviser at the Bank of England and stayed at this role until 1985. Following the events of Black Saturday, Goodhart travelled to Hong Kong to assist in implementing a currency board system that was linked to the United States dollar. This system helped solve the Hong Kong monetary crisis. Goodhart served on the Hong Kong Exchange Fund Advisory Council (an advisory board for the Hong Kong Monetary Authority) from 1983 to 1997).

=== London School of Economics (1986–2002) ===
Following Goodhart's departure from the Bank of England, he re-joined the London School of Economics as the Norman Sosnow Professor of Banking and Finance. He co-founded the Financial Markets Group alongside Mervyn King, in 1986. In late 1987, he gave his first lecture, "The foreign exchange market: a random walk with a dragging anchor", which was reprinted later in Economica. During this period (1988–1995), his work focused on foreign exchange markets, specifically analysing the efficient-market hypothesis. To help with this research, Goodhart (with the help of Reuters) built his own data series. He then collaborated with Swiss firm Olsen and Associates to lead conferences about the importance of high speed data analysis and collection. His results from his work were published in his book The Foreign Exchange Market: Empirical Studies With High-Frequency Data. Questions he asked Neil Shephard around 1991 encouraged the latter to work on problems in financial econometrics.

Goodhart helped advise and publicly supported the Reserve Bank of New Zealand Act (RBNZ) 1989, which permitted the Reserve Bank of New Zealand to vary interest rates to help meet agreed inflation targets. In 1990, Goodhart was elected as a Fellow of the British Academy. In 1997, he was appointed a CBE for services to monetary economics. From late 1997 to May 2000, he was a member of the Monetary Policy Committee.

He retired from the London School of Economics in 2002 at which point he was appointed Emeritus Professor of Banking and Finance. Following his retirement, Goodhart continued to write academic articles and books. He assisted in the British Parliament's review of approaches to monetary policy in 2007. Four years prior to the 2008 financial crisis, Goodhart identified how the global economy was financially unstable in his Per Jacobsson lecture "Some New Directions for Financial Stability?". In the years after the 2008 financial crisis, much of his work has focused on fixing regulation to provide financial stability for the economy, specifically providing reforms that "diminish the extent and volatility of the credit and leverage cycles". In an article included as part of the South African Reserve Bank Conference, Goodhart assessed the actions taken to provide global financial stability and concluded: "proposed reforms are incomplete and/or partially misdirected". In 2015, Goodhart critiqued the Warsh Review of the Bank of England's policy on monetary process.

He was also an economic consultant at Morgan Stanley from 2009 until 2016, when he retired at the age of 80. At the 2021 Central Banking Awards, Goodhart was awarded the Central Banking Lifetime Achievement Award for his work on monetary frameworks, risk management and foreign exchange markets as well as his involvement in the Hong Kong peg, the independence of the Royal Bank of New Zealand and the creation of Goodhart's law.

== Influence ==
=== Goodhart's law ===
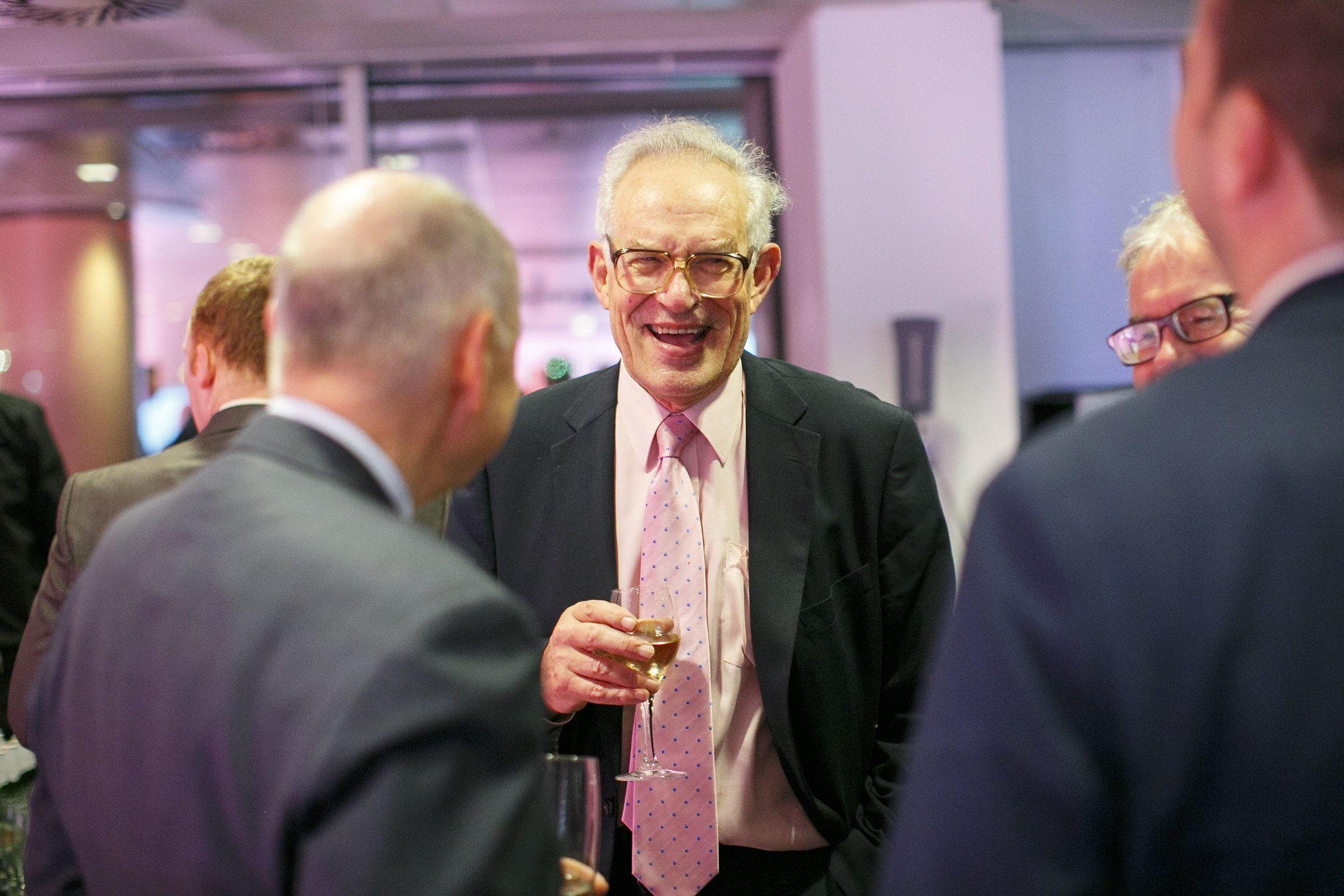
Goodhart at the 2015 Financial Times Economists' Christmas Drinks Reception in London

One of Goodhart's most prominent contributions to monetary economics is known as Goodhart's law. He wrote this law in the footnotes of his paper Problems of monetary management: the UK experience for the Reserve Bank of Australia during his time at the Bank of England (1975). The law states that: "whenever a government seeks to rely on a previously observed statistical regularity for control purposes, that regularity will collapse". Although written initially as a witty comment about monetary targeting, the underlying thought behind this notion was taken very seriously and was linked to the Lucas critique of evaluation and policy modelling.

This law was generalised by anthropologist Marilyn Strathern beyond the world of statistics. The most commonly used version of Goodhart's law comes from Strathern's paper: "When a measure becomes a target, it ceases to be a good measure". In reflection to the creation of Goodhart's law, Goodhart wrote: "it does feel slightly odd to have one's public reputation largely based on a minor footnote".

=== Research ===
Goodhart pioneered the integration of macroeconomics and finance, bringing them together in the monetary and regulatory policies of central banks. He advocates for policies that are supported by a strong theoretical base and backed up by empirical evidence and data. To provide this empirical evidence, Goodhart used economic models that can be expressed in the mathematic form. He found value in mathematical models as they can be integrated with real world data – exposing their usefulness and any underlying interactions.

He is quoted as saying: "It is only by constructing a mathematical institutional economics that one can study the economic system in a rigorous and analytical manner".

Throughout his career, Goodhart played a role in improving the practice of financial regulation and central banking by making it easier for governments and central bankers to benefit public welfare by dampening economic cycles.

Recently, Goodhart has collaborated with a Vietnamese economist, Dr. Lý Hoàng Vũ, to study influences of democracy, economic growth, AI and personal characteristics on interpersonal and institutional trust. They also work on the link between trust and climate change mitigation. In celebrating Goodhart's 90th birthday, Dr. Lý Hoàng Vũ published the book "The trust mechanism in the economic - financial system" where Goodhart wrote the book foreword section. Developing further based on this book, Goodhart and Vu published a VoxEU column named "Trust beyond face-to-face contact: AI and the future of finance". This column has a version in French.

== Selected works ==
Google Scholar listed Goodhart as the author or co-author of 539 articles and books by the end of 2017. His most cited works include Money, Information and Uncertainty and The Evolution of Central Banks.

List of prominent published works
Author	Year	Title	Publisher	Notes
Goodhart, C.	1988	The Evolution of Central Banks	The MIT Press	This book addresses a variety of historical evidence. It argues that central banks serve a natural and necessary function to regulate and supervise commercial banks.
Goodhart, C.	1989	Money, Information and Uncertainty	The MIT Press	This book covers most if not all aspects of monetary economics. It serves as a university textbook. It has eighteen chapters. The first nine focus on microeconomic issues and the following nine focus on macroeconomic issues.
Goodhart, C.	1995	The Central Bank and The Financial System	Palgrave Macmillan	This book contains a collection of twenty-one published articles that address the shifting purpose of central banks over time, assess attempts to preserve price stability and critique debates about the United Kingdom's financial regulation proposals. Part I analyses the functions and purpose of central banking. Part II focuses on the existing objectives of central banks, particularly the maintenance of price stability. Part III takes a broad look at financial regulation and its issues.
Ferrin, E & Goodhart, C	2001	Regulating Financial Services and Markets in the 21st Century	Hart Publishing	This article is a collection of essays that examine the effects of the Financial Services and Markets Act 2000. It specifically looks at the United Kingdom's financial sector and how it is evolving alongside the rapidly changing global economy.
Goodhart, C.	2001	What Weight Should Be Given to Asset Prices in the Measurement of Inflation?	The Economic Journal	This article argues that using pure Alchian/Klein methodology lends excessive weight to unstable asset prices (e.g. housing) and that there are more suitable weighting schemes (e.g. those that derive either from final expenditures or econometrically measured relationships).
Goodhart, C.	2008	The Regulatory Response to the Financial Crisis	CESifo Working Paper Series No. 2257	This paper was Goodhart's response to the 2008 financial crisis. He examines six aspects of financial regulation within the United Kingdom's economy that the 2008 financial crisis highlighted. He then goes on to provide remedies for these regulatory failings.
Brunnermeier, M., Crocket, A., Goodhart, C., Persaud, A. & Shin, H.	2009	The Fundamental Principles of Financial Regulation	International Center for Monetary and Banking Studies Centre for Economic Policy Research	Goodhart co-authored the 'Geneva Report on the World Economy 11'. This report examines and breaks down the regulatory failings that led to the 2008 financial crisis and provides conclusions and recommendations to avoid future economic crisis.
Goodhart, C.	2010	Is a less pro-cyclical financial system an achievable goal?	National Institute Economic Review	In this article, Goodhart explains potential regulations that may lead to banking and finance becoming less cyclical.
Goodhart, C. & Pradhan, M.	2020	The Great Demographic Reversal: Ageing Societies, Waning Inequality, and an Inflation Revival	Palgrave Macmillan	This book looks into what the future holds for the global economy as it is changed by the forces of globalisation and demography. It addresses matters such as dementia, ageing, inequality, retirement, populism and debt finance.
Goodhart, C. & Vu, Ly Hoang	2024	Credibility, trust, and perception of authorities’ performance	VoxEU	When respondents feel most concerned with the need to prevent inflation, trust in all the various institutions of authority has become lower, while it is marginally higher when respondents cite economic growth as one of their most important concerns.
Goodhart, C. & Vu, Ly Hoang	2025	When do People Trust their Government?	DP20109, Discussion Paper Series, CEPR	The study offers three main findings. The first is that economic growth plays a crucial role in determining trust in government, and its importance appears consistent across all regions. The second is the presence of a "Trust Paradox," whereby trust in government tends to be lower in fully democratic countries compared to single-party states, with the exception of Latin America. The third is that migration generally is positively related to trust in government. They explain this by noting that, historically, this has often been the case; however, when inward migration exceeds a certain threshold, the effect on trust often shifts.
Charles Goodhart, Ly Hoang Vu	2025	Who adapts and who finances? Firm-level evidence on climate mitigation, gender, and access to credit	CEPR Discussion Paper Series	
Charles Goodhart, Ly Hoang Vu	2026	The Personal Characteristics that Affect Trust in Government: A Global Analysis Across Regions	CEPR Discussion Paper Series	
Charles Goodhart, Ly Hoang Vu	2026	Macroeconomic Performance and Corporate Climate Change Mitigation Actions: International Evidence and Implications for Vietnam	Banking Review of State Bank of Vietnam	
Charles Goodhart, Ly Hoang Vu	2026	Climate change mitigation actions and the access to finance paradox for firms: International evidence and implications for Vietnam	Banking Review of State Bank of Vietnam	
Charles Goodhart, Ly Hoang Vu	2026	Who Trusts National Institutions and The Role of Media Use: A Global Analysis Across Regions	CEPR Discussion Paper Series	
