= Roy Brewer =

American trade union leader (1909–2006)

Roy Martin Brewer
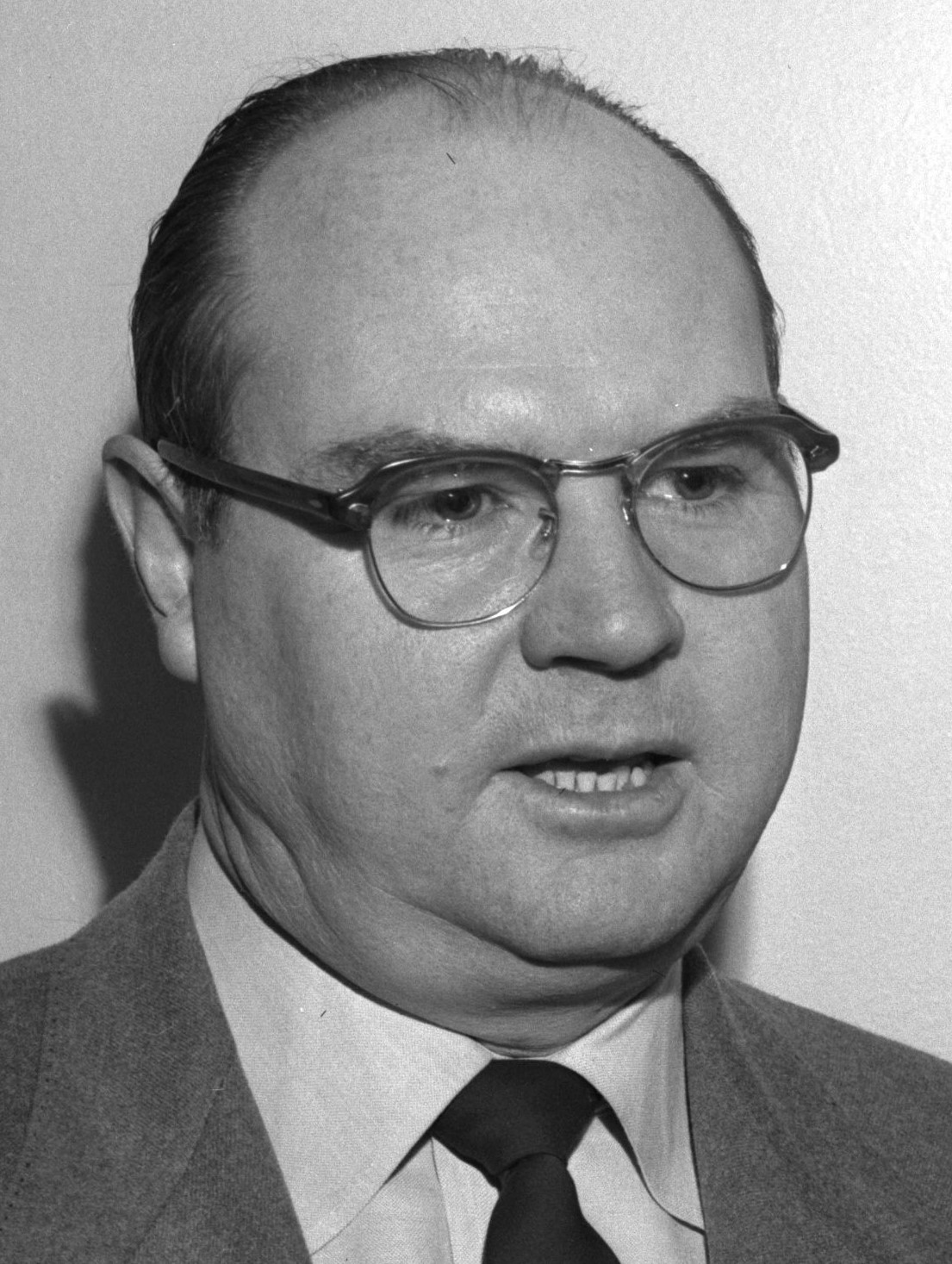
- Brewer in 1954
- Born: August 9, 1909; Cairo, Nebraska
- Died: September 16, 2006 (aged 97); West Hills, California
- Occupation: Union organizer

Roy Martin Brewer (August 9, 1909 – September 16, 2006) was an American trade union leader who was prominently involved in anti-communist activities in the 1940s and 1950s.

== Early life ==
Brewer was born on August 9, 1909, in Cairo, Nebraska, to Martin and Lottie Woodworth Brewer. At age 15 he left school and took a job as an usher in a movie theater. While working at the theater he participated in his first labor strike. He subsequently worked as a projectionist and helped unionize the projectionists in central Nebraska. At age 23, he became president of the Nebraska State Federation of Labor.

== Early political activity ==
In 1936, Brewer worked on the re-election campaign of Nebraska senator George W. Norris, a former Republican who had left the party and was running as an independent. In 1943, President Franklin D. Roosevelt appointed Brewer to the War Production Board that oversaw the use of civilian industrial resources for the war effort during World War II.

== Hollywood union representative ==
In 1945, Brewer became the international representative for the International Alliance of Theatrical Stage Employees (IATSE) union in Hollywood. He worked closely with Ronald Reagan, then a leader in the Screen Actors Guild, to oppose communist influence in unions representing the motion picture industry. On October 28, 1947, Brewer testified before the House Un-American Activities Committee, naming 13 actors, directors, and writers that he believed were communists.

In 1948, Brewer and Reagan co-founded the Labor League of Hollywood Voters to support anti-communist political candidates. In March 1949, the pair formed the Motion Picture Industry Council to fight communism in Hollywood and to clear the names of individuals who had been falsely accused of communist associations. The council also vetted those who had renounced their former associations with communism. In June 1953, Brewer succeeded John Wayne as president of the Motion Picture Alliance for the Preservation of American Ideals, another anti-communist group in Hollywood.

On August 24, 1953, Brewer resigned from his IATSE position in a dispute with IATSE president Richard Walsh. In 1954, Brewer ran against Walsh for the presidency of the union, but Walsh was re-elected.

== Later life ==
After leaving IATSE, Brewer worked primarily as a labor relations executive and consultant, although he worked for the union again for six years in the 1970s. In the 1960s, Brewer was vice-chairman of the Council Against Communist Aggression, an anti-communist group based in Philadelphia.

In May 1984, Brewer's old ally Reagan, having become President of the United States, appointed Brewer as head of the Federal Service Impasses Panel, a group within the Federal Labor Relations Authority that resolves disputes between the federal government and federal employee unions.

Brewer died on September 16, 2006, in West Hills, California, of complications from pneumonia.
