= Motion Picture Alliance for the Preservation of American Ideals =

Defunct American conservative organization

The Motion Picture Alliance for the Preservation of American Ideals (MPAPAI, also MPA) was an American organization of high-profile, politically conservative members of the Hollywood film industry. It was formed in 1944 for the stated purpose of defending the film industry, and the country as a whole, against what its founders claimed was communist and fascist infiltration.

The organization was described by its opponents as fascist-sympathizing, isolationist, antisemitic, red-baiting, anti-unionist, and supportive of Jim Crow laws. The MPA denied these allegations, with Jewish writer and MPA member Morrie Ryskind writing in defence of his fellow members.

== History ==
When the organization was formed in 1944, the initial, immediate purpose was to assemble a group of well-known show business figures willing to attest, under oath, before Congress to the supposed presence of Communists in their industry. When the House Un-American Activities Committee investigated the motion picture industry, the vast majority of "friendly witnesses" were supplied by the Alliance.

The Alliance officially disbanded in 1975.

== Members ==
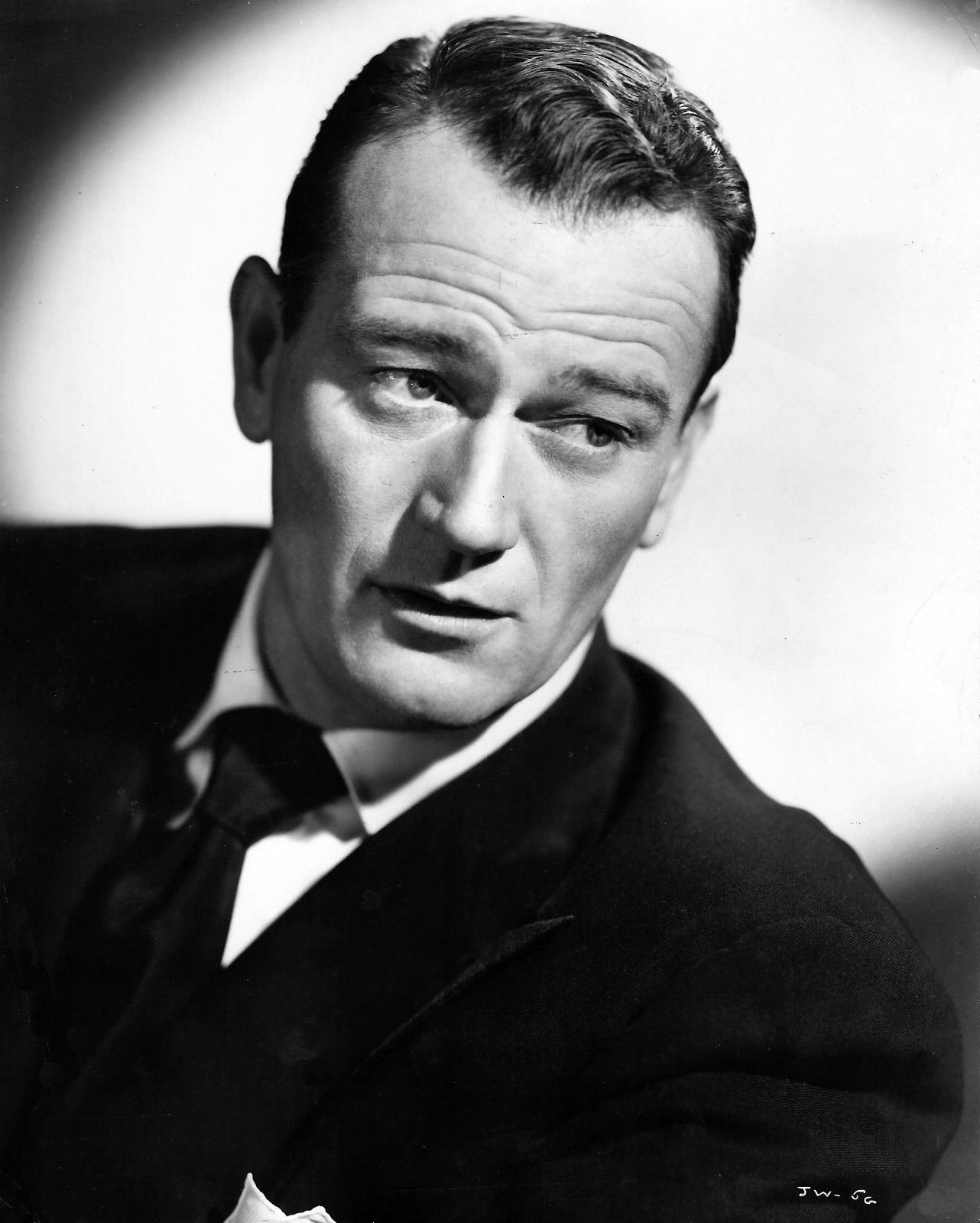
John Wayne served four one-year terms as president of the Alliance from March 1949 to June 1953.

Prominent members of the Alliance included Robert Arthur, Martin Berkeley, Ward Bond, Walter Brennan, Roy Brewer, Clarence Brown, Charles Coburn, Gary Cooper, Laraine Day, Cecil B. DeMille, Walt Disney, Irene Dunne, Victor Fleming, John Ford, Clark Gable, Cedric Gibbons, Hedda Hopper, Leo McCarey, James Kevin McGuinness, Adolphe Menjou, Robert Montgomery, George Murphy, Fred Niblo, Dick Powell, Ayn Rand, Ronald Reagan, Ginger Rogers, Morrie Ryskind, Barbara Stanwyck, Norman Taurog, Robert Taylor, King Vidor, Hal B. Wallis, John Wayne, Frank Wead and Sam Wood.

== Statement of Principles ==
Shortly after its formation in 1944, the Alliance issued a "Statement of Principles":

We believe in, and like, the American way of life: the liberty and freedom which generations before us have fought to create and preserve; the freedom to speak, to think, to live, to worship, to work, and to govern ourselves as individuals, as free men; the right to succeed or fail as free men, according to the measure of our ability and our strength.

Believing in these things, we find ourselves in sharp revolt against a rising tide of communism, fascism, and kindred beliefs, that seek by subversive means to undermine and change this way of life; groups that have forfeited their right to exist in this country of ours, because they seek to achieve their change by means other than the vested procedure of the ballot and to deny the right of the majority opinion of the people to rule.

In our special field of motion pictures, we resent the growing impression that this industry is made of, and dominated by, Communists, radicals, and crackpots. We believe that we represent the vast majority of the people who serve this great medium of expression. But unfortunately it has been an unorganized majority. This has been almost inevitable. The very love of freedom, of the rights of the individual, make this great majority reluctant to organize. But now we must, or we shall meanly lose "the last, best hope on earth."

As Americans, we have no new plan to offer. We want no new plan, we want only to defend against its enemies that which is our priceless heritage; that freedom which has given man, in this country, the fullest life and the richest expression the world has ever known; that system which, in the present emergency, has fathered an effort that, more than any other single factor, will make possible the winning of this war.

As members of the motion-picture industry, we must face and accept an especial responsibility. Motion pictures are inescapably one of the world's greatest forces for influencing public thought and opinion, both at home and abroad. In this fact lies solemn obligation. We refuse to permit the effort of Communist, Fascist, and other totalitarian-minded groups to pervert this powerful medium into an instrument for the dissemination of un-American ideas and beliefs. We pledge ourselves to fight, with every means at our organized command, any effort of any group or individual, to divert the loyalty of the screen from the free America that give it birth. And to dedicate our work, in the fullest possible measure, to the presentation of the American scene, its standards and its freedoms, its beliefs and its ideals, as we know them and believe in them.

== Ayn Rand pamphlet ==
In 1947, Ayn Rand wrote a pamphlet for the Alliance, entitled Screen Guide for Americans, based on her personal impressions of the American film industry. It read, in excerpt:

The purpose of the Communists in Hollywood is not the production of political movies openly advocating Communism. Their purpose is to corrupt our moral premises by corrupting non-political movies — by introducing small, casual bits of propaganda into innocent stories — thus making people absorb the basic principles of Collectivism by indirection and implication.

The principle of free speech requires that we do not use police force to forbid the Communists the expression of their ideas — which means that we do not pass laws forbidding them to speak. But the principle of free speech does not require that we furnish the Communists with the means to preach their ideas, and does not imply that we owe them jobs and support to advocate our own destruction at our own expense.

Rand cited examples of popular and critically acclaimed films that in her view contained hidden Communist or Collectivist messages that had not been recognized as such, even by conservatives. Examples included The Best Years of Our Lives (because it portrayed businessmen negatively, and suggested that bankers should give veterans collateral-free loans), and A Song to Remember (because it implied without historical evidence that Chopin sacrificed himself for a patriotic cause rather than devoting himself to his music).

== See also ==
- Friends of Abe
- Hollywood Congress of Republicans
