= Friends of Abe =

Support and networking group for conservatives working in Hollywood

Friends of Abe, Inc.
- Abbreviation: FOA
- Formation: 2004
- Founder: Gary Sinise
- Dissolved: 2016
- Headquarters: California
- Members: 1,500
- Executive Director: Jeremy Boreing

The Friends of Abe, Inc. (FOA) was a support and networking group for politically conservative members of the film industry in Hollywood. The organization was formed in 2004 by actor Gary Sinise.

== History ==
Screenwriter Lionel Chetwynd helped organize the group. "Friends of Abe" is a reference to "friends of Bill", which is how members of Alcoholics Anonymous sometimes identify themselves, and "friends of Dorothy" (a euphemism for LGBT people), while "Abe" refers to Abraham Lincoln. In January 2012, the organization had more than 1,800 members. In addition to Sinise, Pat Boone, Jon Voight, Kelsey Grammer, Kevin Sorbo, Patricia Heaton, and Scott Baio have stated that they were members of the organization. The organization strongly protected its list of members for whom it maintained a secure private website, abespal.com. Sinise later withdrew from the leadership and Hollywood producer Jeremy Boreing became executive director.

The group met monthly to hear guest speakers. It has hosted a number of Republican politicians at its events, including Herman Cain, Michele Bachmann, Paul Ryan, Rick Santorum, John Boehner, Donald Trump, and Thaddeus McCotter. Supreme Court Justice Antonin Scalia received reimbursement for giving a speech at a FOA fundraiser in 2012. Glenn Beck, Ann Coulter, Michael Steele and Mark Levin have also met with Friends of Abe, as have political operatives Frank Luntz and Karl Rove.

Friends of Abe spent three years trying to get tax-exempt 501(c)(3) status for their organization. The tax status is reserved for organizations that do not engage in any partisan activity. IRS officials questioned whether the organization's promotion of presidential candidates during its events constituted political campaign support, an activity forbidden for tax-exempt organizations. During the application process, FOA refused IRS demands to provide it with access to the part of its website that includes its list of members since such access is not required by federal law. The tax-exempt status was granted in March 2014.

Dole CEO David H. Murdock has hosted FOA's annual gatherings at his 1,300-acre estate, Ventura Farms.

In April 2016 it was announced by executive director Boreing that "Effective immediately, we are going to begin to wind down the 501 c3 organization, bring the Sustaining Membership dues to an end, and do away with the costly infrastructure and the abespal.com website ... because we have been successful in creating a community that extends far beyond our events, people just don't feel as much of a need to show up for every speaker or bar night, and fewer people pay the dues that help us maintain that large infrastructure."

Its founding member, Chetwynd, stated in the month of its announced closure that the 2016 primaries had led to a "civil war in slow motion" within the group, leading many to speculate that the group dissolved because of warring factions over Donald Trump. This theory was bolstered when filmmaker Amanda Milius posted an August 2016 email from Boreing stating that his new website The Daily Wire was an anti-Trump website. A rival group with the same name was founded in 2017, partly due to conservative divisions over Donald Trump.

== See also ==
- Motion Picture Alliance for the Preservation of American Ideals
- Hollywood Congress of Republicans
