= Metric fixation =

Tendency for decision-makers to place excessively large emphases on selected metrics

Metric fixation refers to a tendency for decision-makers to place excessively large emphases on selected metrics.

In management (and many other social science fields), decision makers typically use metrics to measure how well a person or an organization attain desired goal(s). E.g., a company might use "the number of new customers gained" as a metric to evaluate the success of a marketing campaign. The issue of metric fixation is said to arise if the decision maker(s) focus excessively on the metrics, often to the point that they treat "attaining desired values on the metrics" as a core goal (instead of simply an indicator of successes). For example, a school may want to improve the number of students who pass a certain test (metric = "number of students who pass"). This is based on the assumption that the said test truly can evaluate students' ability to succeed in the real world (assuming there already is a good definition of what "success" means). If the said test fails to evaluate the students' ability to function in the working world, focusing solely on increasing their scores on this test might cause the school to ignore other learning goals also crucial for real world functioning. As a result, the students' developments might be impaired.

Although related to several similar, older concepts, the term "metric fixation" was first mentioned in the 2018 book The Tyranny of Metrics. and has since drawn the attention of some management researchers and data scientists.

== See also ==
- Goodhart's law – Adage about statistical measures
- McNamara fallacy – Erroneous reasoning based solely on numeric metrics
- Statistics – Study of collection and analysis of data
- Target culture – Overly rigid focus on performance targets within organisations
