= Surrogation =

Psychological phenomenon; replacement of a construct with its measurement

Surrogation is a psychological phenomenon found in business practices whereby a measure of a construct of interest evolves to replace that construct. Research on performance measurement in management accounting identifies surrogation with "the tendency for managers to lose sight of the strategic construct(s) the measures are intended to represent, and subsequently act as though the measures are the constructs". An everyday example of surrogation is a manager tasked with increasing customer satisfaction who begins to believe that the customer satisfaction survey score actually is customer satisfaction.

== First usage ==
Inspired by work by Yuji Ijiri, the term surrogation was coined by Willie Choi, Gary Hecht, and Bill Tayler in their paper, "Lost in Translation: The Effects of Incentive Compensation on Strategy Surrogation". They show managers tend to use measures as surrogates for strategy, acting as if measures were in fact the strategy when making optimization decisions. This appears to occur even if a measure-maximizing choice ultimately works against the strategy.

They also show surrogation is exacerbated by incentive compensation. But, the phenomenon is distinct from wealth-maximizing behavior, since it persists both when incentives are removed and when they are changed to create an opportunity cost for maximizing the surrogate. The additional tendency to surrogate in the presence of incentives is reduced when managers are compensated based on multiple measures of a strategy rather than on a single measure.

Choi, Hecht, and Tayler proposed attribute substitution as a mechanism for surrogation. Attribute substitution in decision-making involves a complex target attribute being replaced by a more easily accessible heuristic attribute. For this to occur, the target attribute must be relatively inaccessible, the heuristic attribute must be readily accessible, and the mental substitution must not be consciously rejected by the person. In the case of surrogation, the two attributes are related in that some party intends the heuristic attribute to serve as proxy for the target attribute.

== Further studies ==
In a follow-up study, Choi, Hecht, and Tayler demonstrate involving managers in the selection of a strategy reduces their tendency to surrogate. Merely involving managers in the strategy deliberation process does not appear to have the same surrogation-reducing effect as involving them in the actual selection of the strategy.

Jeremiah Bentley shows the effects of incentive compensation on surrogation are partially explained by a mechanism in which measure-based incentive compensation (in this case using a single measure) and wealth-maximizing behavior lead agents to distort their operational decisions (see Campbell's law). That operational distortion, in turn, leads them to change their beliefs about the compensated measure's causal relationship with the outcome—in other words, to surrogate—possibly as a means of reducing cognitive dissonance arising from inconsistency between beliefs and actions. He demonstrates that allowing people to provide narrative explanations for their decisions reduces the amount of operational distortion observed under an incentive compensation scheme, and also reduces surrogation. He also finds that the effect is larger for people who have a high preference for consistency, which supports the argument that surrogation is due to an attempt to reduce cognitive dissonance. Robert Bloomfield had proposed a link between cognitive dissonance and surrogation in an earlier paper.

In a subsequent study, Paul Black, Tom Meservy, Bill Tayler, and Jeff Williams show that surrogation can occur simply when a measure is provided to managers, even if they do not receive incentive compensation based on the measure. That is, if managers know that something is being measured, they will begin to surrogate on that measure, even if they are told that the measure is no more nor less important than other measures when determining their compensation. This implies that firms must be careful in determining what measures are communicated to managers, as managers may surrogate on a measure just because they hear that it is being measured.

In a related study, Black, Meservy, Tayler, Williams, and Brock Kirwan (neuroscientist) use fMRI technology to investigate how surrogation happens at a neurocognitive level. Their study provides evidence that the neurocognitive process involved when considering strategies is similar to the processes when considering abstract words, and that the processes involved when considering measures is similar to the processes when considering concrete words. They provide further evidence that surrogation is an involuntary mistake that can be overcome with effort.

Other studies have evaluated the intentionality of surrogation among executive management. Jeff Reinking, Vicky Arnol, and Steve G. Sutton demonstrate through an exploratory cross-sectional field study with 27 executive to mid-level managers that executive management intentionally designs dashboards to achieve strategy surrogation. The evidence supports that the impact of this intentional surrogation appears to arise through operational managers' beliefs that dashboard measures align with organizational strategy and lead to improved managerial and organizational performance. However, Reinking, Arnol, and Sutton point out that this relationship between the perceived alignment of performance measures and managerial and organizational performance is mediated by the quality of the dashboard and information.

These field tests were followed by another study evaluating the use of KPI (key performance indicator) dashboards by management. The results showed that two primary constructs, strategy alignment and interactive management control, are important factors impacting the extent of dashboard use, perceived managerial performance, and perceived organizational performance. Operational managers perceive that dashboards focused on specifically tailored KPIs lead to both improved managerial and organizational performance. As a result, the study suggests that intentional strategy surrogation may have beneficial effects at the lower operational levels in an organization.

Surrogation is conceptually related to Plato's Allegory of the Cave in that people are failing to distinguish the shadow (i.e. the measure) from the form (i.e. the construct).

Surrogation is also related to Baudrillard's concept of simulacra, in his order-of-simulacra theory. The connection to this concept is discussed in Macintosh, Shearer, Thornton and Welker (2000).

== Popular press ==
In a fall 2019 article, Tayler and doctoral student Michael Harris discussed how surrogation at Wells Fargo led management to inadvertently replace their "build long-term relationships" strategy with their "cross-selling" metric, resulting in a massive account fraud scandal. They also discuss methods for overcoming surrogation, providing examples from Intermountain Healthcare.

Bill Tayler has discussed everyday examples of surrogation and incentive compensation on BYU News Radio.

In his book entitled When More is Not Better: Overcoming America's Obsession with Economic Efficiency, Roger L. Martin explains the pervasiveness of surrogation through examples in business, public policy, and other areas of every-day life. He demonstrates the prevalent nature of surrogation in our thinking through examples like the modern stock market, where "today’s stock price is considered the true and complete manifestation of the value of a company". Martin suggests that "business executives need to turn their backs on the dominant vector of reductionism, recognize that slack is not the enemy, guard against surrogation by using multiple measures, and appreciate that monopolization is not a sustainable goal". Martin warns that while surrogating in the business domain is a natural tendency, it is a danger that facilitates "gaming" and "makes executives unreflective about how their business really works". To guard against surrogation, Martin suggests using multiple measurements and, in particular, contradictory proxies, helping managers to "think integratively" and mitigate the risk of gaming on proxy measurements.

== See also ==
- Goodhart's law
- Map–territory relation
- McNamara fallacy
