= Reflexivity (social theory) =

Circular relationships between cause and effect

In epistemology, and more specifically, the sociology of knowledge, reflexivity refers to circular relationships between cause and effect, especially as embedded in human belief structures. A reflexive relationship is multi-directional when the causes and the effects affect the reflexive agent in a layered or complex sociological relationship. The complexity of this relationship can be furthered when epistemology includes religion.

Within sociology more broadly—the field of origin—reflexivity means an act of self-reference where existence engenders examination, by which the thinking action "bends back on", refers to, and affects the entity instigating the action or examination. It commonly refers to the capacity of an agent to recognise forces of socialisation and alter their place in the social structure. A low level of reflexivity would result in individuals shaped largely by their environment (or "society"). A high level of social reflexivity would be defined by individuals shaping their own norms, tastes, politics, desires, and so on. This is similar to the notion of autonomy. (See also structure and agency and social mobility.)

Within economics, reflexivity refers to the self-reinforcing effect of market sentiment, whereby rising prices attract buyers whose actions drive prices higher still until the process becomes unsustainable. This is an instance of a positive feedback loop. The same process can operate in reverse leading to a catastrophic collapse in prices.

== Overview ==
In social theory, reflexivity may occur when theories in a discipline should apply equally to the discipline itself; for example, in the case that the theories of knowledge construction in the field of sociology of scientific knowledge should apply equally to knowledge construction by sociology of scientific knowledge practitioners, or when the subject matter of a discipline should apply equally to the individual practitioners of that discipline (e.g., when psychological theory should explain the psychological processes of psychologists). More broadly, reflexivity is considered to occur when the observations of observers in the social system affect the very situations they are observing, or when theory being formulated is disseminated to and affects the behavior of the individuals or systems the theory is meant to be objectively modeling. Thus, for example, an anthropologist living in an isolated village may affect the village and the behavior of its citizens under study. This, in turn, also affects how the anthropologist interacts with those citizens. The observations are not independent of the participation of the observer.

Reflexivity is, therefore, a methodological issue in the social sciences analogous to the observer effect. Within that part of recent sociology of science that has been called the strong programme, reflexivity is suggested as a methodological norm or principle, meaning that a full theoretical account of the social construction of, say, scientific, religious or ethical knowledge systems, should itself be explainable by the same principles and methods as used for accounting for these other knowledge systems. This points to a general feature of naturalized epistemologies, that such theories of knowledge allow for specific fields of research to elucidate other fields as part of an overall self-reflective process: any particular field of research occupied with aspects of knowledge processes in general (e.g., history of science, cognitive science, sociology of science, psychology of perception, semiotics, logic, neuroscience) may reflexively study other such fields yielding to an overall improved reflection on the conditions for creating knowledge.

Reflexivity includes both a subjective process of self-consciousness inquiry and the study of social behavior with reference to theories about social relationships.

== History ==
The principle of reflexivity was perhaps first enunciated by the sociologists William I. Thomas and Dorothy Swaine Thomas, in their 1928 book The child in America: "If men define situations as real, they are real in their consequences". The theory was later termed the "Thomas theorem".

Sociologist Robert K. Merton (1948, 1949) built on the Thomas principle to define the notion of a self-fulfilling prophecy: that once a prediction or prophecy is made, actors may accommodate their behaviours and actions so that a statement that would have been false becomes true or, conversely, a statement that would have been true becomes false - as a consequence of the prediction or prophecy being made. The prophecy has a constitutive impact on the outcome or result, changing the outcome from what would otherwise have happened.

Reflexivity was taken up as an issue in science in general by Karl Popper (1957), who in his book The Poverty of Historicism highlighted the influence of a prediction upon the event predicted, calling this the 'Oedipus effect' in reference to the Greek tale in which the sequence of events fulfilling the Oracle's prophecy is greatly influenced by the prophecy itself. Popper initially considered such self-fulfilling prophecy a distinguishing feature of social science, but later came to see that in the natural sciences, particularly biology and even molecular biology, something equivalent to expectation comes into play and can act to bring about that which has been expected. It was also taken up by Ernest Nagel (1961). Reflexivity presents a problem for science because if a prediction can lead to changes in the system that the prediction is made in relation to, it becomes difficult to assess scientific hypotheses by comparing the predictions they entail with the events that actually occur. The problem is even more difficult in the social sciences.

Reflexivity has been taken up as the issue of "reflexive prediction" in economic science by Grunberg and Modigliani (1954) and Herbert A. Simon (1954), has been debated as a major issue in relation to the Lucas critique, and has been raised as a methodological issue in economic science arising from the issue of reflexivity in the sociology of scientific knowledge (SSK) literature.

Reflexivity has emerged as both an issue and a solution in modern approaches to the problem of structure and agency, for example in the work of Anthony Giddens in his structuration theory and Pierre Bourdieu in his genetic structuralism.

Giddens, for example, noted that constitutive reflexivity is possible in any social system, and that this presents a distinct methodological problem for the social sciences. Giddens accentuated this theme with his notion of "reflexive modernity" – the argument that, over time, society is becoming increasingly more self-aware, reflective, and hence reflexive.

Bourdieu argued that the social scientist is inherently laden with biases, and only by becoming reflexively aware of those biases can the social scientists free themselves from them and aspire to the practice of an objective science. For Bourdieu, therefore, reflexivity is part of the solution, not the problem.

Michel Foucault's The order of things can be said to touch on the issue of Reflexivity. Foucault examines the history of Western thought since the Renaissance and argues that each historical epoch (he identifies three and proposes a fourth) has an episteme, or "a historical a priori", that structures and organises knowledge. Foucault argues that the concept of man emerged in the early 19th century, what he calls the "Age of Man", with the philosophy of Immanuel Kant. He finishes the book by posing the problem of the age of man and our pursuit of knowledge- where "man is both knowing subject and the object of his own study"; thus, Foucault argues that the social sciences, far from being objective, produce truth in their own mutually exclusive discourses.

== In economics ==
Economic philosopher George Soros, influenced by ideas put forward by his tutor, Karl Popper (1957), has been an active promoter of the relevance of reflexivity to economics, first propounding it publicly in his 1987 book The alchemy of finance. He regards his insights into market behaviour from applying the principle as a major factor in the success of his financial career.

Reflexivity is inconsistent with general equilibrium theory, which stipulates that markets move towards equilibrium and that non-equilibrium fluctuations are merely random noise that will soon be corrected. In equilibrium theory, prices in the long run at equilibrium reflect the underlying economic fundamentals, which are unaffected by prices. Reflexivity asserts that prices do in fact influence the fundamentals and that these newly influenced sets of fundamentals then proceed to change expectations, thus influencing prices; the process continues in a self-reinforcing pattern. Because the pattern is self-reinforcing, markets tend towards disequilibrium. Sooner or later they reach a point where the sentiment is reversed and negative expectations become self-reinforcing in the downward direction, thereby explaining the familiar pattern of boom and bust cycles. An example Soros cites is the procyclical nature of lending, that is, the willingness of banks to ease lending standards for real estate loans when prices are rising, then raising standards when real estate prices are falling, reinforcing the boom and bust cycle. He further suggests that property price inflation is essentially a reflexive phenomenon: house prices are influenced by the sums that banks are prepared to advance for their purchase, and these sums are determined by the banks' estimation of the prices that the property would command.

Soros has often claimed that his grasp of the principle of reflexivity is what has given him his "edge" and that it is the major factor contributing to his successes as a trader. For several decades there was little sign of the principle being accepted in mainstream economic circles, but there has been an increase of interest following the crash of 2008, with academic journals, economists, and investors discussing his theories.

Economist and former columnist of the Financial Times, Anatole Kaletsky, argued that Soros' concept of reflexivity is useful in understanding China's economy and how the Chinese government manages it.

In 2009, Soros funded the launch of the Institute for New Economic Thinking with the hope that it would develop reflexivity further. The Institute works with several types of heterodox economics, particularly the post-Keynesian branch.

== In sociology ==
Margaret Archer has written extensively on laypeople's reflexivity. For her, human reflexivity is a mediating mechanism between structural properties, or the individual's social context, and action, or the individual's ultimate concerns. Reflexive activity, according to Archer, increasingly takes the place of habitual action in late modernity since routine forms prove ineffective in dealing with the complexity of modern life trajectories.

While Archer emphasises the agentic aspect of reflexivity, reflexive orientations can themselves be seen as being "socially and temporally embedded". For example, Elster points out that reflexivity cannot be understood without taking into account the fact that it draws on background configurations (e.g., shared meanings, as well as past social engagement and lived experiences of the social world) to be operative.

== In anthropology ==
In anthropology, reflexivity has come to have two distinct meanings, one that refers to the researcher's awareness of an analytic focus on his or her relationship to the field of study, and the other that attends to the ways that cultural practices involve consciousness of and commentary on themselves.

The first sense of reflexivity in anthropology is part of social science's more general self-critique in the wake of theories by Michel Foucault and others about the relationship of power and knowledge production. Reflexivity about the research process became an important part of the critique of the colonial roots and scientistic methods of anthropology in the "writing cultures" movement associated with James Clifford and George Marcus, as well as many other anthropologists. Rooted in literary criticism and philosophical analysis of the relationship among the anthropologists, the people represented in texts, and their textual representations, this approach has fundamentally changed ethical and methodological approaches in anthropology. As with the feminist and anti-colonial critiques that provide some of reflexive anthropology's inspiration, the reflexive understanding of the academic and political power of representations, analysis of the process of "writing culture" has become a necessary part of understanding the situation of the ethnographer in the fieldwork situation. Objectification of people and cultures and analysis of them only as objects of study has been largely rejected in favor of developing more collaborative approaches that respect local people's values and goals. Nonetheless, many anthropologists have accused the "writing cultures" approach of muddying the scientific aspects of anthropology with too much introspection about fieldwork relationships, and reflexive anthropology have been heavily attacked by more positivist anthropologists. Considerable debate continues in anthropology over the role of postmodernism and reflexivity, but most anthropologists accept the value of the critical perspective, and generally only argue about the relevance of critical models that seem to lead anthropology away from its earlier core foci.

The second kind of reflexivity studied by anthropologists involves varieties of self-reference in which people and cultural practices call attention to themselves. One important origin for this approach is Roman Jakobson in his studies of deixis and the poetic function in language, but the work of Mikhail Bakhtin on carnival has also been important. Within anthropology, Gregory Bateson developed ideas about meta-messages (subtext) as part of communication, while Clifford Geertz's studies of ritual events such as the Balinese cock-fight point to their role as foci for public reflection on the social order. Studies of play and tricksters further expanded ideas about reflexive cultural practices. Reflexivity has been most intensively explored in studies of performance, public events, rituals, and linguistic forms but can be seen any time acts, things, or people are held up and commented upon or otherwise set apart for consideration. In researching cultural practices, reflexivity plays an important role, but because of its complexity and subtlety, it often goes under-investigated or involves highly specialised analyses.

One use of studying reflexivity is in connection to authenticity. Cultural traditions are often imagined as perpetuated as stable ideals by uncreative actors. Innovation may or may not change tradition, but since reflexivity is intrinsic to many cultural activities, reflexivity is part of tradition and not inauthentic. The study of reflexivity shows that people have both self-awareness and creativity in culture. They can play with, comment upon, debate, modify, and objectify culture through manipulating many different features in recognised ways. This leads to the metaculture of conventions about managing and reflecting upon culture.

== Reflexivity and the status of the social sciences ==
Flanagan has argued that reflexivity complicates all three of the traditional roles that are typically played by a classical science: explanation, prediction and control. The fact that individuals and social collectivities are capable of self-inquiry and adaptation is a key characteristic of real-world social systems, differentiating the social sciences from the physical sciences. Reflexivity, therefore, raises real issues regarding the extent to which the social sciences may ever be viewed as "hard" sciences analogous to classical physics, and raises questions about the nature of the social sciences.

== See also ==
- Campbell's law – Adage about perverse incentives
- Collaborative intelligence
- Collective intelligence – Group intelligence that emerges from collective efforts
- Double hermeneutic – Proposed connection between lay concepts and social sciences
- Goodhart's law – Adage about statistical measures
- Hawthorne effect – Social phenomenon by which being observed causes behavioral changes
- Intersubjectivity – Concept in philosophy and psychology
- Observer effect (physics) – Fact that observing a situation changes it
- Observer-expectancy effect – Cognitive bias of experimental subject
- Performativity – Linguistic quality
- Social epistemology – Knowledge as a collective achievement
- Virtuous circle and vicious circle – Self-reinforcing sequence of events
- Reciprocal causation – Biological concept
