= Lucas critique =

1970s paradigm shift in economic thought, named for American economist Robert Lucas

The Lucas critique argues that it is naive to try to predict the effects of a change in economic policy entirely on the basis of relationships observed in historical data, especially highly aggregated historical data. More formally, it states that the decision rules of Keynesian models—such as the consumption function—cannot be considered as structural in the sense of being invariant with respect to changes in government policy variables. It was named after American economist Robert Lucas's work on macroeconomic policymaking.

The Lucas critique is significant in the history of economic thought as a representative of the paradigm shift that occurred in macroeconomic theory in the 1970s towards attempts at establishing micro-foundations.

== Thesis ==
The Lucas critique was not new in 1976. The argument and the whole logic was first presented by Frisch (1938) and discussed by Haavelmo (1944), among others. Related ideas are expressed as Campbell's law and Goodhart's law—but in a 1976 paper, Lucas drove to the point that this simple notion invalidated policy advice based on conclusions drawn from large-scale macroeconometric models. Because the parameters of those models were not structural, i.e. not policy-invariant, they would necessarily change whenever policy (the rules of the game) was changed. Policy conclusions based on those models would therefore potentially be misleading. This argument called into question the prevailing large-scale econometric models that lacked foundations in dynamic economic theory. Lucas summarized his critique:

Given that the structure of an econometric model consists of optimal decision rules of economic agents, and that optimal decision rules vary systematically with changes in the structure of series relevant to the decision maker, it follows that any change in policy will systematically alter the structure of econometric models.

The Lucas critique is, in essence, a negative result. It tells economists, primarily, how not to do economic analyses. The Lucas critique suggests that if we want to predict the effect of a policy experiment, we should model the "deep parameters" (relating to preferences, technology, and resource constraints) that are assumed to govern individual behavior: so-called "microfoundations". If these models can account for observed empirical regularities, we can then predict what individuals will do, taking into account the change in policy, and then aggregate the individual decisions to calculate the macroeconomic effects of the policy change.

Shortly after the publication of Lucas's article, Kydland and Prescott published the article "Rules rather than Discretion: The Inconsistency of Optimal Plans", where they not only described general structures where short-term benefits are negated in the future through changes in expectations, but also how time consistency might overcome such instances. That article and subsequent research led to a positive research program for how to do dynamic, quantitative economics.

The Lucas critique does not invalidate that fiscal policy may be countercyclical, which some associate with John Maynard Keynes.

== Examples ==
One important application of the critique (independent of proposed microfoundations) is its implication that the historical negative correlation between inflation and unemployment, known as the Phillips curve, could break down if the monetary authorities attempted to exploit it. Permanently raising inflation in hopes that this would permanently lower unemployment would eventually cause firms' inflation forecasts to rise, altering their employment decisions. In other words, just because high inflation was associated with low unemployment under early 20th century monetary policy does not mean that high inflation should be expected to lead to low unemployment under every alternative monetary policy regime.

For a simple example, consider the question of how much Fort Knox should spend on protection. Fort Knox has never been robbed. Statistical analysis using high-level, aggregated data would therefore indicate that the probability of a robbery is independent of the resources spent on guards. The policy implication from such analysis would be to eliminate the guards and save those resources. This analysis would, however, be subject to the Lucas Critique, and the conclusion would be misleading. In order to properly analyze the trade-off between the probability of a robbery and resources spent on guards, the "deep parameters" (preferences, technology and resource constraints) that govern individual behaviour must be taken explicitly into account. In particular, criminals' incentives to attempt to rob Fort Knox depends on the presence of the guards. In other words, with the heavy security that exists at the fort today, criminals are unlikely to attempt a robbery because they know they are unlikely to succeed. However, a change in security policy, such as eliminating the guards, would lead criminals to reappraise the costs and benefits of robbing the fort. So just because there are no robberies under the current policy does not mean this should be expected to continue under all possible policies. In order to answer the question of how much resources Fort Knox should spend on protection, the analyst must model the "deep parameters" and strive to predict what individuals will do conditional on the change in policy.

For a monetary policy example, consider a central bank that has historically followed a rule where interest rates respond primarily to current inflation. Historical data analysis shows that rate increases reliably reduce inflation after 12–18 months. Now imagine policymakers decide to switch to a strongly forward-looking approach, responding to expected future inflation instead. The Lucas critique emerges because this change fundamentally alters how private agents form expectations about future policy actions. As shown in Chen and Valcarcel's research, different expectation horizons (how far ahead agents look) produce significantly different economic responses to the same policy action. Moreover, as Batini and Haldane state: "It has long been recognized that economic policy in general, and monetary policy in particular, needs a forward-looking dimension." The historical relationship between interest rates and inflation breaks down precisely because agents adapt their forecasting behavior to the new policy framework. This phenomenon reinforces the fundamental insight that policy changes alter the very structure of econometric models used to evaluate them. What worked under the old regime—where a certain interest rate increase produced a predictable inflation decline—no longer holds because firms and households now incorporate the central bank's forward-looking behavior into their own decision-making.

== See also ==
- Campbell's law
- Dynamic inconsistency
- Dynamic stochastic general equilibrium
- Game theory
- Goodhart's law
- Hasty generalization
- Macroeconomic model
- McNamara fallacy
- Methodological individualism
- Newcomb's paradox
- Policy-ineffectiveness proposition
- Problem of induction
- Rational expectations
- Real business cycles
- Structural estimation
- Variable change
