= Knowledge-based decision making =

Decision-making process

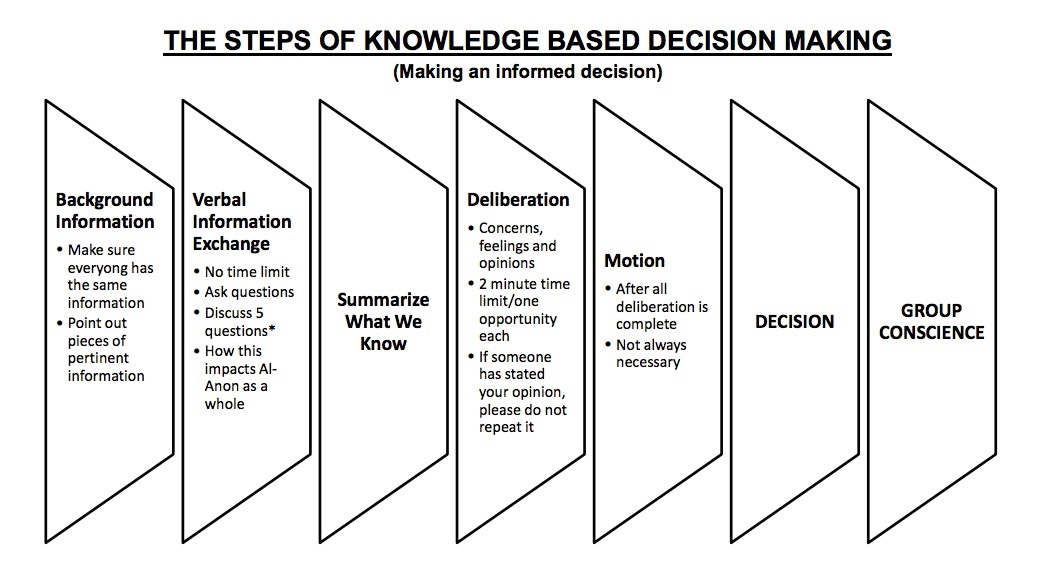
Knowledge-based decision making model

Knowledge-Based Decision-Making (KBDM) in management is a decision-making process that uses predetermined criteria to measure and ensure the optimal outcome for a specific topic.

KBDM is used to make decisions by establishing a thought process and reasoning behind a decision. It gathers vital background essentials to collectively increase understanding about a topic or agreed criteria.

== Key elements ==
History of knowledge management is quite short because there was a long-time lack of consensus on what would be a good definition of knowledge management. Before starting to use knowledge management as a theoretical frame there was only know-how about thinking with knowledge. The most important key factor of knowledge management is recognizing tacit and explicit knowledge.

Open communication between leadership and membership consists of being able to demonstrate face-to-face dialogue, exchange information and experiences, and sharing facts with one another. Each party takes turns listening and respects what others have to say. There should be regular dialogue and communication between individuals regarding the specified topic.

Dialogue before deliberation – "I must consider all the facts and examine the possible consequences". Dialogue before deliberation recommends communicating prior to demonstrating actions. It is similar to KBDM in that background information about the selected topic must be gathered and made available to all the decision makers prior to meeting or discussing the information. The storage location of materials and sources is shared so that all decision makers involved have equal access to the same information. During the duration of the discussion period, background information and facts are evaluated and discussed among the decision makers. This is done so that decision makers can use this time as an opportunity to ask questions about the specified topic and receive timely and appropriate responses. The overall purpose of these meetings is to discuss the background information, as well as ensuring each decision makers' questions have been answered, via face-to-face contact.

All decision makers have common access to information – All information involved in the KBDM process must be distributed equally to all decision makers and the sources should be stored in a mutual location to ensure the same grounds for each decision maker. It is important that all of the information provided to the decision makers have the same content.

Decisions makers exist in a culture of trust – Organizational culture comes from individual beliefs, procedures, norms, values, and meanings shared by other members in the organization. Organizational culture has an impact on an individual's behavior in various situations. "Culture" is based on the characteristics and behavior among a particular group of individuals. Corresponding to this, knowledge-based decision making tries to focus on functioning within an environment containing a variety of components, including respecting one another's decisions and listening to each other. These factors influence a culture since they can contribute to how an individual feels within the environment. This influence can be positive or negative, reducing the amount of fear and pressure put on individuals if they make a mistake. If individuals feel as though they need advice, the culture can assist individuals, since it would be normal to help each other, by reassuring as well as encouraging. In contrast, not having a culture of trust can increase the level of risk when making decisions, as individuals may take advantage of situations and be non-supportive or unwilling to give advice to others.

=== Advantages ===
Open communication contributes to increased relevant overall knowledge and understanding about the topic, doing this can limit both confusion and misunderstanding.

Dialogue before deliberation gives a clear direction of the conversation and provides an opportunity for decision makers to prepare by viewing background information founded, which can generate a better understanding of the topic involved. Decision makers are prepared for discussions as they have the chance to formulate questions and identify specific aspects of the findings and information they want to discuss or develop. The decision makers gain a clearer and rounded understanding of the topic beforehand from the background information provided.

All decision makers have common access to information. Having information published in one location contributes to ease of access and ensures availability, allowing decision makers to view information efficiently and effectively before a meeting. Publishing information beforehand allows members to have sufficient time to become informed about the content provided, generate further questions, and express opinions about the matter to reach the most suitable outcome.

Decision makers exist in a culture of trust. It allows them to help, advise, and support each other, as well as fostering a common goal towards achieving the same objectives. The content of information needed to make an informed decision supersedes authority, and group members are more likely to support a decision made because of their contribution.

=== Disadvantages ===
Holding open communication can still lead to confusion if some decision makers do not communicate effectively. Miscommunication can still occur between individuals from different perceptions.

Dialogue before deliberation may be impeded by individuals who may not have read the background information or understand the direction of the conversation. Background information provided may be hard to understand and impact preparation time.

All decision makers have common access to information that may not always be possible for all decision makers. Storing all information in one location is a huge risk if the location is compromised. Background information may be outdated.

In business settings, new decision makers may not fully the culture of trust, which can affect how they interpret information, seek advice or participate in group decisions. Internet-based knowledge management tools can help businesses to organize information and make shared content available to decision makers. However, it does not remove the need for trust, communication and critical evaluation.

== Process ==
The process is composed of six main components:

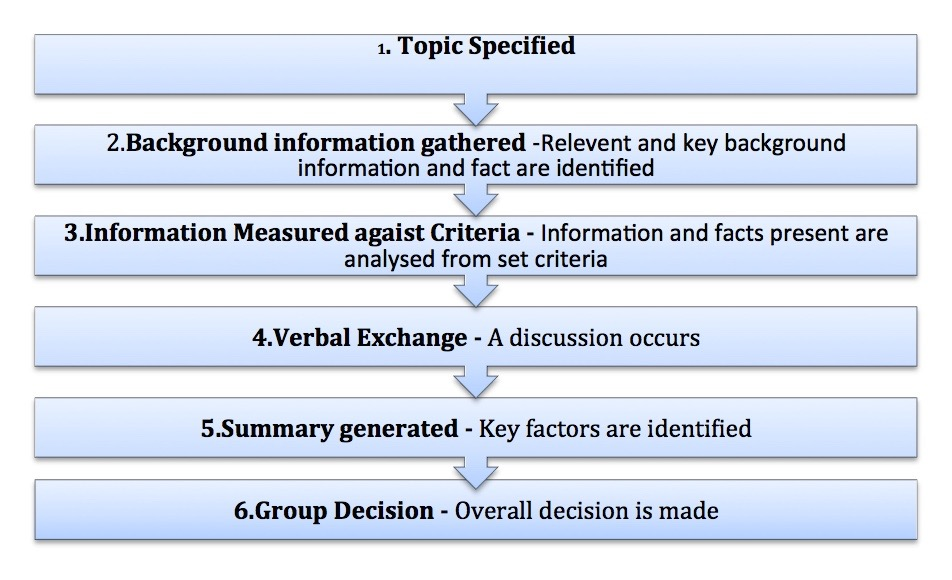
Knowledge-based decision making (KBDM)

1. A topic is specified.
2. Relevant background information and key facts are identified and gathered in relation to the specified topic. This information is stored in a mutual location and made accessible to all decision makers. At this stage, decision makers may add any missing information.
3. The background information is analyzed using set criteria, or a set of questions by the decision makers. During this stage, questions and queries are created.
4. A discussion occurs between all decision makers; questions and queries are discussed during this stage. Concerns and opinions are also stated during this stage.
5. From the discussions and information gathered a summary is made. The purpose of the summary is to clearly outline key factors that are most relevant to the specified topic.
6. The results and findings from the analysis are discussed among decision makers as a group to ensure that the best possible outcome can be made strategically.

== Purpose ==
The KBDM process allows the main focus and emphasis to be on the actual decision and reasoning. Authority is not a major factor.

In KBDM, there are structures in place that allow methodical approaches to occur and indicate a starting point when making vital decisions. In this case, KBDM is used as an indicator and standard guideline which can be applied to decision-making situations.

At the beginning of the process, the relevant information is gathered so that the overall decision can be based on background information and factual knowledge. By researching background information can focus on particular areas in the topic. The structure enables the thought process of a decision to be specified and states the reasons behind a decision, so if an issue occurs with the overall outcome the thought process can be evaluated thoroughly.

In regards to business, the KBDM process can give companies or organizations a competitive advantage, create common grounds, and gain an understanding of others in the same sector due to the structured format. The structure supports and is suited to assist long-term planning and strategic decision-making. At the beginning of the process key background information is assembled to increase the amount of knowledge and understanding each individual decision maker has about the topic; vital aspects of information are included. Discovered research and information are put into a mutual location to provide equal grounds in terms of knowledge before a discussion occurs to give time for questions to be established. From the KBDM process, a decision can be made based on facts, understanding and suitable reasoning from discussions to conclude the most appropriate decision.

== Questions ==
In the third stage of the process background information is measured against a set of questions. These questions are answered and then used to contribute to the overall decision made.

Questions that are used to measure information include:

1. What do we currently know about the needs, wants and preferences of our members that relate to this discussion?
2. What do we know about both our resources and strategic position that is relevant to this issue?
3. What do we know about the current environment and culture that relates to this issue?
4. What are the (ethical) implications of our choice (pros and cons)?
5. What do we not know about this issue that we wish we knew?
6. How do the organization's legacies apply to this issue?
7. What is your part in the process?

== Decision making in project management ==
Effective project management is best achieved using an adaptive approach focused on effective decision-making. Therefore, a variety of tools based on software and structure have been developed to support decision making in groups. Decision Making processes are strongly correlated to the level of available knowledge regarding the environment, the decision is based on. Successfully using knowledge management supporting tools improves overall project performance and is an essential method for organizations with project-related work styles.

== Knowledge management in B2B decision making ==
In B2B contexts, knowledge management can support decision-making by helping businesses organise internal knowledge, share relevant information and evaluate problems using structured processes.

Studies have examined the relationship between knowledge management and organizational outcomes such as organizational performance, product quality and organizational learning. However, research on how decision-making style influences the relationship between knowledge management and organizational performance remains limited.

Decision-making is a central part of the problem solving process. The process often begins with defining the problem, analyzing the initial situation, identifying possible methods or tools, selecting a solution and then optimizing the proposed outcome. Organizations using this approach may also need to identify, update and monitor critical knowledge, data resources and information relevant to their operations.

== See also ==
- Crowdsourcing
- Enterprise resource planning
- Evidence-based policy
- Knowledge management
- Knowledge society
- Management
- Online participation
