= McNamara fallacy =

Exclusive reliance on quantitative observations in decision-making

The McNamara fallacy (also known as the quantitative fallacy), named for Robert McNamara, the U.S. Secretary of Defense from 1961 to 1968, involves making a decision based solely on quantitative observations (or metrics) and ignoring all others. The reason given is often that these other observations cannot be proven.

Here is what happens when the McNamara discipline is applied too literally: The first step is to measure whatever can be easily measured. This is okay as far as it goes. The second step is to disregard that which can't be easily measured or give it an arbitrary quantitative value. This is artificial and misleading. The third step is to presume that what can't be measured easily really isn't very important. This is blindness. The fourth step is to say that what can't be easily measured really doesn't exist. This is suicide.

— Daniel Yankelovich, The New Odds

Yankelovich believed that this approach was what led the United States to defeat in the Vietnam War—specifically, McNamara's focus on quantifiable measures of success in the war (e.g. enemy body counts), ignoring other variables.

== Origin ==
Yankelovich coined the term 'McNamara fallacy' in a 1971 speech highlighting the changing nature of the marketing industry and the risks of overly metrics-focused marketing strategies.

He named the fallacy after McNamara because it represented a failure mode of the metrics-focused approach to management that the latter had pioneered.

"When a method is developed to its logical extreme, both its strengths and limitations stand out sharply so that one can see them clearly. The many strengths of the McNamara method of quantification have been justly celebrated in business and in government. But the method has also revealed some notable weaknesses.

It is one of these weaknesses that I refer to as the McNamara fallacy—a fallacy that poses a particularly acute threat today to many aspects of American life, including marketing."

— Daniel Yankelovich, The New Odds

== Examples in warfare ==
=== Vietnam War ===
The McNamara fallacy is often considered in the context of the Vietnam War, in which the U.S. Secretary of Defense Robert McNamara attempted to reduce war to a mathematical model.

==== 1962 meeting with Edward Lansdale ====
One example arose in an early 1962 conversation between U.S. Air Force Brigadier General Edward Lansdale and McNamara. Lansdale reportedly told McNamara, who was trying to develop a list of metrics to allow him to scientifically follow the progress of the war, that he needed to add an 'x-factor'; McNamara wrote that down on his list in pencil and asked what it was. Lansdale told him it was the feelings of the common rural Vietnamese people. McNamara then erased it and sarcastically told Lansdale that he could not measure it.

==== 1964 meetings with Desmond FitzGerald ====
New York Times correspondent David Halberstam wrote about McNamara's fixation on metrics:

In 1964 Desmond FitzGerald, the number-three man in the CIA, was briefing him every week on Vietnam, and FitzGerald, an old Asia hand, was made uneasy by McNamara's insistence on quantifying everything, of seeing it in terms of statistics, infinite statistics. One day after McNamara had asked him at great length for more and more numbers, more information for the data bank, FitzGerald told him bluntly that he thought most of the statistics were meaningless, that it just didn't smell right, that they were all in for a much more difficult time than they thought. McNamara just nodded curtly, and it was the last time he asked FitzGerald to brief him.

==== Body counts ====
Another example of the fallacy is the enemy body count metric which was taken to be a precise and objective measure of success. By increasing estimated enemy deaths and minimizing one's own, victory would be assured. Critics such as Jonathan Salem Baskin and Stanley Karnow noted that guerrilla warfare, widespread resistance, and inevitable inaccuracies in estimates of enemy casualties can thwart this formula.

==== 1965 Da Nang visit ====
David Halberstam wrote of another such incident in which qualitative facts were disregarded due to quantitative bias:

One particular visit seemed to sum it up: McNamara looking for the war to fit his criteria, his definitions. He went to Danang in 1965 to check on the Marine progress there. A Marine colonel in I Corps had a sand table showing the terrain and patiently gave the briefing: friendly situation, enemy situation, main problem. McNamara watched it, not really taking it in, his hands folded, frowning a little, finally interrupting. "Now, let me see," McNamara said, "if I have it right, this is your situation," and then he spouted his own version, all in numbers and statistics. The colonel, who was very bright, read him immediately like a man breaking a code, and without changing stride, went on with the briefing, simply switching his terms, quantifying everything, giving everything in numbers and percentages, percentages up, percentages down, so blatant a performance that it was like a satire. Jack Raymond of the New York Times began to laugh and had to leave the tent. Later that day Raymond went up to McNamara and commented on how tough the situation was up in Danang, but McNamara wasn't interested in the Vietcong, he wanted to talk about that colonel, he liked him, that colonel had caught his eye. "That colonel is one of the finest officers I've ever met," he said.

Halberstam would conclude: "he [McNamara] did not serve himself nor the country well; he was, there is no kinder or gentler word for it, a fool."

=== Global war on terror ===
Donald Rumsfeld, US Secretary of Defense under George W. Bush, sought to prosecute wars with better data, clear objectives, and achievable goals. Writes Jon Krakauer:

... the sense of urgency attached to the mission came from little more than a bureaucratic fixation on meeting arbitrary deadlines so missions could be checked off a list and tallied as 'accomplished'. This emphasis on quantification has always been a hallmark of the military, but it was carried to new heights of fatuity during Donald Rumsfeld's tenure at The Pentagon. Rumsfeld was obsessed with achieving positive 'metrics' that could be wielded to demonstrate progress in the Global War on Terror.

Although, Rumsfeld did show a sense of the existence, and importance, of data that was not quantifiable with his famous "There are unknown unknowns" answer to a question posed at a U.S. Department of Defense (DoD) news briefing on February 12, 2002.

... there are known knowns ... there are known unknowns ... there are also unknown unknowns—the ones we don't know we don't know. And if one looks throughout the history of our country and other free countries, it is the latter category that tends to be the difficult ones.

This shows at least some progression away from the McNamara fallacy ('The fourth step is to say that what can't be easily measured really doesn't exist').

== In modern clinical trials ==
There has been discussion of the McNamara fallacy in medical literature. In particular, the McNamara fallacy is invoked to describe the inadequacy of only using progression-free survival (PFS) as a primary endpoint in clinical trials for agents treating metastatic solid tumors simply because PFS is an endpoint which is merely measurable, while failing to capture outcomes which are more meaningful, such as overall quality of life or overall survival.

== In competitive admissions processes ==
In competitive admissions processes—such as those used for graduate medical education—evaluating candidates using only numerical metrics results in ignoring non-quantifiable factors and attributes which may ultimately be more relevant to the applicant's success in the position.

== See also ==
- List of fallacies
- Allegory of the cave – Allegory by Plato
- Epistemic fallacy – Formal fallacy about knowledge of objects
- Goodhart's law – Adage about statistical measures
- Metric fixation – Tendency for decision-makers to place excessively large emphases on selected metrics
- Newton's flaming laser sword – Verificationist principle
- Occam's razor – Philosophical problem-solving principle
- Streetlight effect – Bias from searching only where it is easy
- Surrogation – Psychological phenomenon; replacement of a construct with its measurement
- Truth – Conformity to reality
- Verificationism – Philosophical doctrine
- Verisimilitude – Resemblance to reality

== Sources ==
- Baskin, Jonathan Salem (July 25, 2014). "According To U.S. Big Data, We Won The Vietnam War". Forbes. Archived from the original on September 11, 2014.
- Basler, Michael H. (2009). "Utility of the McNamara fallacy". BMJ. 339 b3141. doi:10.1136/bmj.b3141. S2CID 71916631.
- Booth, Christopher M.; Eisenhauer, Elizabeth A. (2012). "Progression-Free Survival: Meaningful or Simply Measurable?". Journal of Clinical Oncology. 30 (10): 1030–1033. doi:10.1200/JCO.2011.38.7571. PMID 22370321.
- Carmody, JB (2019). "On residency selection and the quantitative fallacy". Journal of Graduate Medical Education. 11 (4): 420–421. doi:10.4300/JGME-D-19-00453.1. PMC 6699544. PMID 31440336.
- Fischer, D. H. (June 1970). Historians' fallacies: toward a logic of historical thought. Harper torchbooks (first ed.). New York: HarperCollins. ISBN 978-0-06-131545-9. OCLC 185446787.
- Halberstam, David (1972). The Best and the Brightest. Random House. ISBN 978-0-449-90870-9.
- Karnow, Stanley (1983). Vietnam A History. New York: Viking. ISBN 0-14-026547-3.
- Krakauer, Jon (2009). Where Men Win Glory: The Odyssey of Pat Tillman. Doubleday. ISBN 978-0-385-52226-7.
- Phillips, Rufus (2008). Why Vietnam Matters. Naval Institute Press. ISBN 978-1-682-47310-8.
- Yankelovich, Daniel (November 15, 1971). "Interpreting the New Life Styles". Sales Management, the Marketing Magazine. Dartnell Corporation.
