= Evidence-based policy =

Approach to decision-making and policy based on empirical data and analysis

Evidence-based policy (also known as evidence-informed policy or evidence-based governance) is a concept in public policy that advocates for policy decisions to be grounded on, or influenced by, rigorously established objective evidence. This concept presents a stark contrast to policymaking predicated on ideology, 'common sense', anecdotes, or personal intuitions. The methodology employed in evidence-based policy often includes comprehensive research methods such as randomized controlled trials (RCT). Good data, analytical skills, and political support to the use of scientific information are typically seen as the crucial elements of an evidence-based approach.

An individual or organisation is justified in claiming that a specific policy is evidence-based if, and only if, three conditions are met. First, the individual or organisation possesses comparative evidence about the effects of the specific policy in comparison to the effects of at least one alternative policy. Second, the specific policy is supported by this evidence according to at least one of the individual's or organisation's preferences in the given policy area. Third, the individual or organisation can provide a sound account for this support by explaining the evidence and preferences that lay the foundation for the claim.

The effectiveness of evidence-based policy hinges upon the presence of quality data, proficient analytical skills, and political backing for the utilization of scientific information.

While proponents of evidence-based policy have identified certain types of evidence, such as scientifically rigorous evaluation studies like randomized controlled trials, as optimal for policymakers to consider, others argue that not all policy-relevant areas are best served by quantitative research. This discrepancy has sparked debates about the types of evidence that should be utilized. For example, policies concerning human rights, public acceptability, or social justice may necessitate different forms of evidence than what randomized trials provide. Furthermore, evaluating policy often demands moral philosophical reasoning in addition to the assessment of intervention effects, which randomized trials primarily aim to provide.

In response to such complexities, some policy scholars have moved away from using the term evidence-based policy, adopting alternatives like evidence-informed. This semantic shift allows for continued reflection on the need to elevate the rigor and quality of evidence used, while sidestepping some of the limitations or reductionist notions occasionally associated with the term evidence-based. Discussions on evidence-informed policy have considered, for example, the inclusion of policy, practice and public stakeholders in the production of evidence; the relevance, adaptability and acceptability of evidence, alongside issues of rigour and quality; and how power and politics permeate the production and use of evidence. Despite these nuances, the phrase "evidence-based policy" is still widely employed, generally signifying a desire for evidence to be used in a rigorous, high-quality, and unbiased manner, while avoiding its misuse for political ends.

== History ==
The shift towards contemporary evidence-based policy is deeply rooted in the broader movement towards evidence-based practice. This shift was largely influenced by the emergence of evidence-based medicine during the 1980s. However, the term 'evidence-based policy' was not adopted in the medical field until the 1990s. In social policy, the term was not employed until the early 2000s.

The initial instance of evidence-based policy was manifested in tariff-making in Australia. The legislation necessitated that tariffs be informed by a public report issued by the Tariff Board. This report would cover the tariff, industrial, and economic implications.

=== History of evidence-based medicine ===
Evidence-based medicine (EBM) is a term that was first introduced by Gordon Guyatt. Nevertheless, examples of EBM can be traced back to the early 1900s. Some contend that the earliest instance of EBM dates back to the 11th century when Ben Cao Tu Jing from the Song dynasty suggested a method to evaluate the efficacy of ginseng.

Many scholars regard evidence-based policy as an evolution from "evidence-based medicine", where research findings are utilized to support clinical decisions. In this model, evidence is collected through randomized controlled trials (RCTs) which compare a treatment group with a placebo group to measure outcomes.

While the earliest published RCTs in medicine date back to the 1940s and 1950s, the term 'evidence-based medicine' did not appear in published medical research until 1993. In the same year, the Cochrane Collaboration was established in the UK. This organization works to keep all RCTs up-to-date and provides "Cochrane reviews", which present primary research in human health and health policy.

The usage of the keyword EBM has seen a significant increase since the 2000s, and the influence of EBM has substantially expanded within the field of medicine.

=== History of evidence-based policy making ===
The application of randomized controlled trials in social policy was notably later than in the medical field. Although elements of an evidence-based approach can be traced back as far as the fourteenth century, it was popularized more recently during the tenure of the Blair Government in the United Kingdom. This government expressed a desire to shift away from ideological decision-making in policy formulation. For instance, a 1999 UK Government white paper, Modernising Government, emphasized the need for policies that "really deal with problems, are forward-looking and shaped by evidence rather than a response to short-term pressures; [and] tackle causes not symptoms."

This shift in policy formulation led to an upswing in research and activism advocating for more evidence-based policy-making. As a result, the Campbell Collaboration was established in 1999 as a sibling organization to the Cochrane Collaboration. The Campbell Collaboration undertakes reviews of the most robust evidence, analyzing the impacts of social and educational policies and practices.

The Economic and Social Research Council (ESRC) furthered the drive for more evidence-based policymaking by granting £1.3 million to the Evidence Network in 1999. One outcome of this investment was the establishment of the first international, peer-reviewed journal dedicated to the study of the field, Evidence and Policy in 2005. Similar to both the Campbell and Cochrane Collaborations, the Evidence Network functioned as a hub for evidence-based policy and practice. From 2011 to 2022 the Alliance for Useful Evidence was established, funded by the ESRC, Big Lottery, and Nesta, to advocate for the use of evidence in social policy and practice. The Alliance, operating throughout the UK, promoted the use of high-quality evidence to inform decisions on strategy, policy, and practice through advocacy, research publication, idea sharing, advice, event hosting, and training. It also supported the development of the UK's What Works network. Current collaborations in the UK supporting the field include Transforming Evidence and the Transforming Evidence Network (TEN).

The application of evidence-based policy varies among practitioners. For instance, Michael Kremer and Rachel Glennerster, curious about strategies to enhance students' test scores, conducted randomized controlled trials in Kenya. They experimented with new textbooks and flip charts, and smaller class sizes, but they discovered that the only intervention that boosted school attendance was treating intestinal worms in children. Their findings led to the establishment of the Deworm the World Initiative, a charity highly rated by GiveWell for its cost-effectiveness.

Recent discussions have emerged about the potential conflicts of interest in evidence-based decision-making applied to public policy development. In their analysis of vocational education in prisons run by the California Department of Corrections, researchers Andrew J. Dick, William Rich, and Tony Waters found that political factors inevitably influenced "evidence-based decisions," which were ostensibly neutral and technocratic. They argue that when policymakers, who have a vested interest in validating previous political judgments, fund evidence, there is a risk of corruption, leading to policy-based evidence making.

== Methodology ==
Evidence-based policy employs various methodologies, but they all commonly share the following characteristics:

- They test a theory as to why the policy will be effective and what the impacts of the policy will be if it is successful.
- They include a counterfactual: an analysis of what would have occurred if the policy had not been implemented.
- They incorporate some measurement of the impact.
- They examine both direct and indirect effects that occur because of the policy.
- They identify uncertainties and control for external influences outside of the policy that may affect the outcome.
- They can be tested and replicated by a third party.

The methodology used in evidence-based policy aligns with the cost-benefit framework. It is designed to estimate a net payoff if the policy is implemented. Due to the difficulty in quantifying some effects and outcomes of the policy, the focus is primarily on whether benefits will outweigh costs, rather than assigning specific values.

== Types of evidence in evidence-based policy making ==
Various types of data can be considered evidence in evidence-based policy making. The scientific method organizes this data into tests to validate or challenge specific beliefs or hypotheses. The outcomes of various tests may hold varying degrees of credibility within the scientific community, influenced by factors such as the type of blind experiment (blind vs. double-blind), sample size, and replication. Advocates for evidence-based policy strive to align societal needs (as framed within Maslow's Hierarchy of needs) with outcomes that the scientific method indicates as most probable.

=== Quantitative evidence ===
Quantitative evidence for policymaking includes numerical data from peer-reviewed journals, public surveillance systems, or individual programs. Quantitative data can also be collected by the government or policymakers themselves through surveys. Both evidence-based medicine (EBM) and evidence-based public health policy constructions extensively utilize quantitative evidence.

=== Qualitative evidence ===
Qualitative evidence comprises non-numerical data gathered through methods such as observations, interviews, or focus groups. It is often used to craft compelling narratives to influence decision-makers. The distinction between qualitative and quantitative data does not imply a hierarchy; both types of evidence can be effective in different contexts. Policymaking often involves a combination of qualitative and quantitative evidence. However, EBPM tends to prioritize qualitative evidence over quantitative evidence; for instance, the U.S. Commission of Evidence-Based Policymaking's 2017 report used the work "Evidence" only to refer to information produced by “statistical activities” for a “statistical purpose” explicitly overlooking qualitative forms of evidence.

== Scholarly communication in policy-making ==
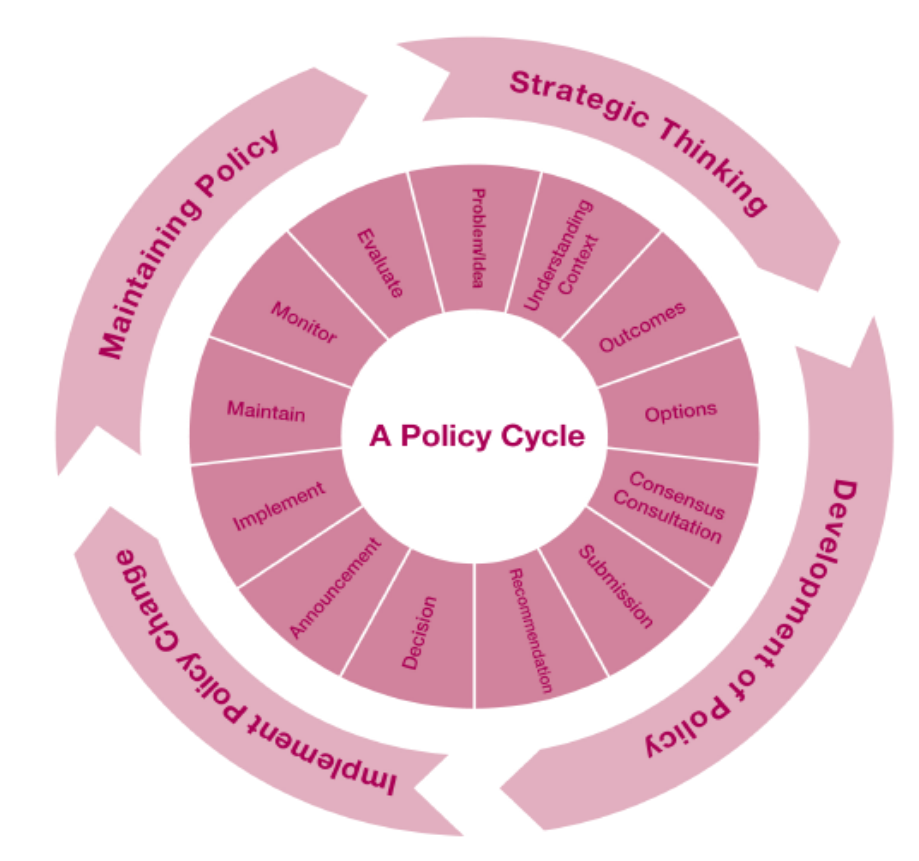
Example of the policy cycle concept

Academics provide input to policy beyond the production of content relating to issues addressed via policy through various channels:

- some studies investigate existing policies (policy studies)
- some studies include policy options with varying levels of specificity or detail or compare possible rough pathway-options
- some science-related organizations devise concrete policy proposals
- some academics engage in science communication or activism in various ways such as by holding press conferences, actively engaging with news media, engaging direct action themselves to attract media attention, writing collectively-signed public documents, social media activities, or creating open letters.

== Evidence-based policy initiatives by non-governmental organizations ==
=== Overseas Development Institute ===
The Overseas Development Institute (now ODI Global) asserts that research-based evidence can significantly influence policies that have profound impacts on lives. Illustrative examples mentioned in the UK's Department for International Development's (DFID) new research strategy include a 22% reduction in neonatal mortality in Ghana, achieved by encouraging women to initiate breastfeeding within one hour of childbirth, and a 43% decrease in mortality among HIV-positive children due to the use of a widely accessible antibiotic.

Following numerous policy initiatives, the ODI conducted an evaluation of their evidence-based policy efforts. This analysis identified several factors contributing to policy decisions that are only weakly informed by research-based evidence. Policy development processes are complex, seldom linear or logical, thus making the direct application of presented information by policy-makers an unlikely scenario. These factors encompass information gaps, secrecy, the necessity for rapid responses versus slow data availability, political expediency (what is popular), and a lack of interest among policy-makers in making policies more scientifically grounded. When a discrepancy is identified between the scientific process and political process, those seeking to reduce this gap face a choice: either to encourage politicians to adopt more scientific methods or to prompt scientists to employ more political strategies.

The ODI suggested that, in the face of limited progress in evidence-based policy, individuals and organizations possessing relevant data should leverage the emotional appeal and narrative power typically associated with politics and advertising to influence decision-makers. Instead of relying solely on tools like cost–benefit analysis and logical frameworks, the ODI recommended identifying key players, crafting compelling narratives, and simplifying complex research data into clear, persuasive stories. Rather than advocating for systemic changes to promote evidence-based policy, the ODI encouraged data holders to actively engage in the political process.

Furthermore, the ODI posited that transforming a person who merely 'finds' data into someone who actively 'uses' data within our current system necessitates a fundamental shift towards policy engagement over academic achievement. This shift implies greater involvement with the policy community, the development of a research agenda centered on policy issues instead of purely academic interests, the acquisition of new skills or the formation of multidisciplinary teams, the establishment of new internal systems and incentives, increased investment in communications, the production of a different range of outputs, and enhanced collaboration within partnerships and networks.

The Future Health Systems consortium, based on research undertaken in six countries across Asia and Africa, has identified several key strategies to enhance the incorporation of evidence into policy-making. These strategies include enhancing the technical capacity of policy-makers; refining the presentation of research findings; leveraging social networks; and establishing forums to facilitate the connection between evidence and policy outcomes.

=== The Abdul Latif Jameel Poverty Action Lab (J-PAL) ===
J-PAL is a Research Organization which was founded in 2003 and is based at the Massachusetts Institute of Technology. As of 2020, the organization has "over 1,000 completed and ongoing RCTs in 84 countries" and receives funding from many sources including the Gates Foundation and the United Kingdom's Foreign, Commonwealth & Development Office. The work of J-PAL highlights a potential limit of the efficacy of this form of intervention as only "Eleven, or 2%, of the 543 RCTs conducted and completed by J-PAL (of the 811 launched) have actually been scaled up."

=== The Pew Charitable Trusts ===
The Pew Charitable Trusts is a non-governmental organization dedicated to using data, science, and facts to serve the public good. One of its initiatives, the Results First, collaborates with different US states to promote the use of evidence-based policymaking in the development of their laws. The initiative has created a framework that serves as an example of how to implement evidence-based policy.

Pew's five key components of evidence-based policy are:

1. Program Assessment: This involves systematic reviews of the available evidence on the effectiveness of public programs, the development of a comprehensive inventory of funded programs, categorization of these programs by their proven effectiveness, and identification of their potential return on investment.
2. Budget Development: This process incorporates the evidence of program effectiveness into budget and policy decisions, prioritizing funding for programs that deliver a high return on investment. It involves integrating program performance information into the budget development process, presenting information to policymakers in user-friendly formats, including relevant studies in budget hearings and committee meetings, establishing incentives for implementing evidence-based programs and practices, and building performance requirements into grants and contracts.
3. Implementation Oversight: This ensures that programs are effectively delivered and remain faithful to their intended design. Key aspects include establishing quality standards for program implementation, building and maintaining capacity for ongoing quality improvement and monitoring of fidelity to program design, balancing program fidelity requirements with local needs, and conducting data-driven reviews to improve program performance.
4. Outcome Monitoring: This involves routinely measuring and reporting outcome data to determine whether programs are achieving their desired results. It includes developing meaningful outcome measures for programs, agencies, and the community, conducting regular audits of systems for collecting and reporting performance data, and regularly reporting performance data to policymakers.
5. Targeted Evaluation: This process involves conducting rigorous evaluations of new and untested programs to ensure they warrant continued funding. This includes leveraging available resources to conduct evaluations, targeting evaluations to high-priority programs, making better use of administrative data for program evaluations, requiring evaluations as a condition for continued funding for new initiatives, and developing a centralized repository for program evaluations.

== Cost-benefit analysis in evidence-based policy ==
Cost-benefit analysis (CBA) is a method used in evidence-based policy. It is an economic tool used to assess the economic, social, and environmental impacts of policies. The aim is to guide policymakers toward decisions that increase societal welfare.

The use of cost-benefit analysis in policy-making was first mandated by President Ronald Reagan's Executive Order 12291 in 1981. This order stated that administrative decisions should use sufficient information regarding the potential impacts of regulation. Maximizing the net benefits to society was a primary stated focus among the five general requirements of the order. EO 12291 built on the Nixon administration's expansion of federal control over agencies; in particular, his Quality of Life Review which directed agencies to submit "significant" proposed rules, including a "a comparison of expected costs and benefits" to the Office of Management and Budget.

Later presidents, including Bill Clinton and Barack Obama, modified but still emphasized the importance of cost-benefit analysis in their executive orders. For example, Clinton's Executive Order 12866 maintained cost-benefit analysis but also stressed the importance of flexibility, public involvement, and coordination among agencies.

During the Obama administration, Executive Order 13563 further strengthened the role of cost-benefit analysis in regulatory review. The EO encouraged agencies to consider values that are difficult or impossible to quantify, like equity, human dignity, and fairness.

The use of cost-benefit analysis in these executive orders highlights its central role in evidence-based policy. By comparing the potential impacts of different policy options, cost-benefit analysis can aid in policy decisions that are based on empirical evidence and designed to maximize societal benefits.

== Critiques ==
Evidence-based policy has faced several critiques. Paul Cairney, a professor of politics and public policy at the University of Stirling in Scotland, contends that proponents of the approach often underestimate the complexity of policy-making and misconstrue how policy decisions are typically made. Nancy Cartwright and Jeremy Hardie question the emphasis on randomized controlled trials (RCTs), arguing that evidence from RCTs is not always sufficient for making decisions. They suggest that applying experimental evidence to a policy context requires an understanding of the conditions present within the experimental setting and an assertion that these conditions also exist in the target environment of the proposed intervention. Additionally, they argue that the prioritization of RCTs could lead to the criticism of evidence-based policy being overly focused on narrowly defined 'interventions', which implies surgical actions on one causal factor to influence its effect.

The concept of intervention within the evidence-based policy movement aligns with James Woodward's interventionist theory of causality. However, policy-making also involves other types of decisions, such as institutional reforms and predictive actions. These other forms of evidence-based decision-making do not necessitate evidence of an invariant causal relationship under intervention. Hence, mechanistic evidence and observational studies are often adequate for implementing institutional reforms and actions that do not alter the causes of a causal claim.

Furthermore, there have been reports of frontline public servants, such as hospital managers, making decisions that detrimentally affect patient care to meet predetermined targets. This argument was presented by Professor Jerry Muller of the Catholic University of America in his book The Tyranny of Metrics.

== See also ==
- Argument map
- Effective altruism
- Evidence-based legislation
- Evidence-based management
- Evidence-based policing
- Evidence-based practices
- Evidence-based research
- Inverse benefit law
- Knowledge-based decision making
- Libertarian paternalism
- March for Science
- Nudge theory
- Policy-based evidence making
- Politicization of science
- Science policy
- Scientocracy
- Technocracy
- Wildlife Enforcement Monitoring System
