= Hollywood Congress of Republicans =

The Hollywood Congress of Republicans (HCR) is a chapter of the California Congress of Republicans, itself a permanently chartered organization of the California Republican Party. Founded in 2001, the group's members are conservatives who work in the film industry in Hollywood.

== See also ==
- Friends of Abe
- Motion Picture Alliance for the Preservation of American Ideals
