= Victor Montori =

Peruvian-Spanish-American medical researcher (born 1970)

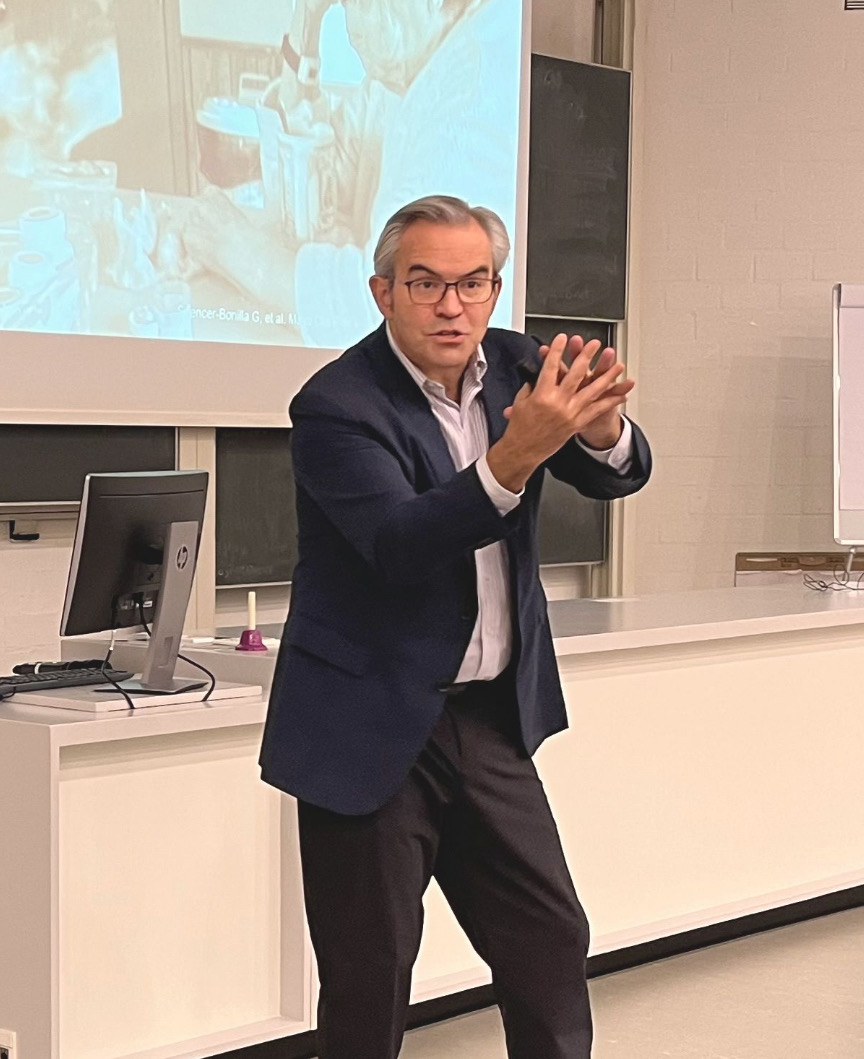
- Born: Victor M. Montori; Lima, Peru
- Education: Cayetano Heredia University, McMaster University, Mayo Clinic
- Occupations: Physician, medical researcher, care activist
- Organization: Mayo Clinic
- Known for: Research into evidence-based medicine, shared-decision making, diabetes care, and the clinical encounter.
- Notable work: Why We Revolt: A Patient Revolution for Careful and Kind Care

Victor M. Montori (born in Lima, 1970) is a Peruvian-Spanish-American physician. An endocrinologist, health services researcher, and care activist, Montori is the Robert H. and Susan B. Rewoldt Professor at the Mayo Clinic in Rochester, Minnesota. He is a professor of medicine, and the founder and lead investigator of the Knowledge and Evaluation Research (KER) Unit.

In 2023, he was awarded the Robert H. and Susan M. Rewoldt Professorship in Endocrinology at Mayo Clinic.

He is also a 2024-2025 Human Rights and Technology Fellow at the Carr-Ryan Center for Human Rights at the Harvard Kennedy School.

In 2025, Aristotle University School of Medicine's Department of Medicine conferred upon him an honorary doctorate in recognition of his contributions to evidence-based medicine and patient-centered care.

Montori is known for contributions to evidence-based medicine, shared decision-making, the development of minimally disruptive medicine and for co-founding The Patient Revolution, a global organization that serves as the backbone for a movement for careful and kind care for all.

== Early life and education ==
Victor M. Montori was born in 1970 in Lima, Peru. He earned his Doctor of Medicine (M.D.) degree from Universidad Peruana Cayetano Heredia in Lima between 1987 and 1995.

Following medical school, Montori completed his internal medicine residency at the Mayo Clinic in Rochester, Minnesota, serving from 1996 to 1999, and was appointed Chief Medical Resident from 1999 to 2000. He remained at Mayo to pursue advanced training in endocrinology, becoming a fellow in endocrinology, diabetes, metabolism, and nutrition in 2000–2002, and earning an M.S. in Biomedical Research from the Mayo Clinic Graduate School of Biomedical Sciences in 2001.

From 2002 to 2004, Montori was awarded a Mayo Foundation Scholarship to pursue a research fellowship at McMaster University in Hamilton, Ontario, where he trained under Gordon Guyatt in clinical epidemiology and evidence-based medicine.

== Contributions to evidence‑based medicine ==
Montori collaborated extensively with his mentor, Gordon Guyatt, on methodological work in clinical epidemiology and evidence-based medicine. Their joint research addressed methodological issues in the interpretation of clinical trials. Montori and colleagues investigated how stopping randomized controlled trials early due to apparent benefit can lead to inflated estimates of treatment effects and poor clinical decision making. He also contributed to identifying and describing "spin" in trial reporting, particularly in the use of composite endpoints that may exaggerate the benefits of interventions.

Montori participated in the development of the GRADE (Grading of Recommendations Assessment, Development and Evaluation) framework and its later synthesis and simplification, Core GRADE, used internationally to assess the quality of evidence and strength of clinical recommendations.

He was a long-time faculty member of McMaster University's “How to Teach Evidence-Based Healthcare” course and a contributor to the Users’ Guides to the Medical Literature, a JAMA series and reference text that has helped clinicians interpret and apply clinical research.

Throughout his work, Montori emphasized that evidence-based medicine must integrate high-quality evidence with clinical expertise and patients’ values and preferences. This patient-centered orientation laid the foundation for his later contributions to shared decision making.

== Contributions to shared decision making ==
Montori has contributed to the science and practice of shared decision making (SDM), particularly in chronic disease care, through methodological innovation and implementation research.

Drawing on his role with the SPARC Innovation Program, Montori integrated service design principles into healthcare delivery, facilitating iterative, patient-centered redesign of clinical workflows and decision contexts. This work informed the development and testing of conversation tools for shared decision making — tools designed with the participation of end-users for use during clinical encounters to support decision-making. These were created through a rigorous user-centered design process and evaluated via video analysis of care visits to assess their effect on clinician-patient conversations about care plans.

In collaboration with Ian G. Hargraves and Marleen Kunneman, Montori advocated shifting SDM from a rudimentary choice-based model to a collaborative problem-solving framework that aligns decisions with patients' real-life circumstances and capacities. Their work emphasizes evaluating the nature of the patient's problem and tailoring SDM approaches accordingly.

== Contributions to minimally disruptive medicine and treatment burden ==
Montori has been instrumental in developing and promoting minimally disruptive medicine, an approach that recognizes the transference of work (time, effort, attention, tasks) from the healthcare system to the patient and their family. This recognition of the work of being a patient, and of the effect it has on the patient's quality of life, also known as the treatment burden, demands that care plans that are designed to advance patient goals also seek to minimize the burden of treatment.

Dr. Montori co-authored the seminal 2009 BMJ article, “We need minimally disruptive medicine”, alongside Carl May and Frances Mair, introducing the minimally disruptive medicine framework and calling for care that makes intellectual, practical, and emotional sense for patients.

Minimally disruptive medicine and the recognition of patient work is derived from normalization process theory. Furthermore, it often applies the Cumulative Complexity Model (CuCoM), which examines how a mismatch between a patient's workload (healthcare demands) and their capacity (resources, abilities, context) affects outcomes. Tools and strategies advocated include medication therapy management, community navigation support, lean consumption, and deprescribing frameworks—designed to ease healthcare's footprint while preserving or enhancing health outcomes.

Montori also contributed to efforts to develop instruments that quantify treatment burden, the impact of the work of accessing and using healthcare and enacting self-care on patients’ lives. Key measures include the Treatment Burden Questionnaire (TBQ) and the Patient Experience with Treatment and Self-management (PETS).

== Contributions to diabetes care ==
Montori has significantly influenced the management of type 2 diabetes by promoting shared decision making (SDM), challenging tight glycemic control paradigms, and developing patient-centered decision aids.

Montori and colleagues designed and evaluated the Diabetes Medication Choice decision aid to help patients and clinicians compare medication options during clinical encounters (demo). Other tools for use during diabetes consultations include Statin Choice, CV Prevention Choice, and QBSAFE cards. Through both development and evaluation, Montori's encounter tools have enhanced SDM implementation in diabetes care by fostering patient education and involving patients actively in treatment choices—although their impact on clinical outcomes remains mixed.

Moving beyond individualized protocols, Montori has criticized overly strict glycemic targets, challenging the evidence for glycemic control, and advocating instead for reducing the risk of diabetes-related complications and aligning treatment intensity with individual patient goals and life contexts.

== Public service ==
Montori was appointed by U.S. Secretary of Health and Human Services Kathleen Sebelius to serve on the National Advisory Council for the Agency for Healthcare Research and Quality (AHRQ) from 2012 to 2015. He later continued his federal service as a Senior Advisor at AHRQ's Center for Evidence and Practice Improvement from 2016 to 2020.

== Care activism and The Patient Revolution ==
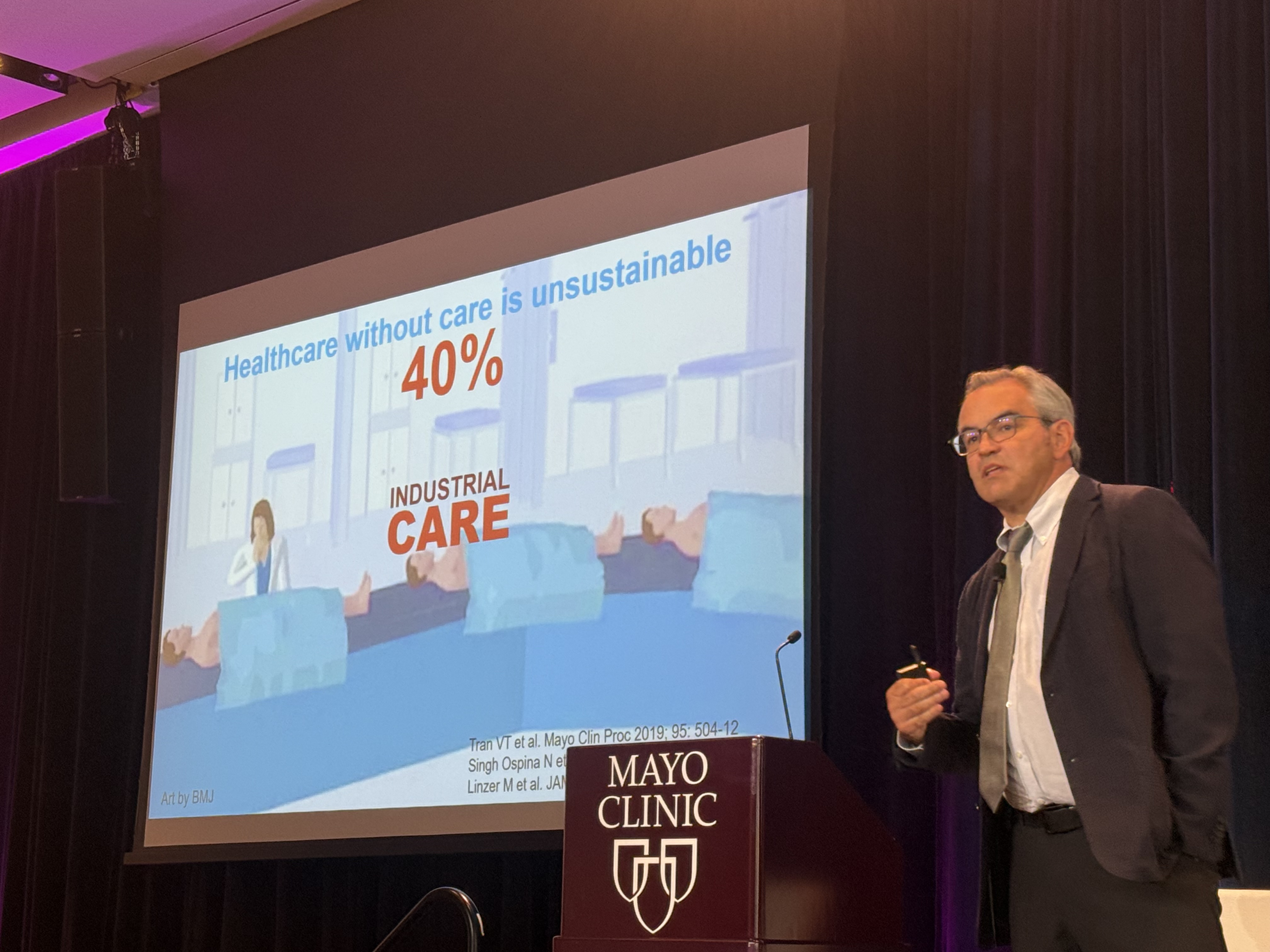
Victor M. Montori MD speaking on industrialized healthcare at Mayo Clinic in 2025

In 2016, Montori co-founded, with philanthropist Phil Warburton, The Patient Revolution, a nonprofit advocacy movement aiming to transform healthcare from impersonal “industrialized” systems into deeply humane systems offering “careful and kind care.” The initiative includes public and professional education, community organizing, innovation, and strategic partnerships to support fundamental change in healthcare toward careful and kind care for all.

== Why We Revolt ==
Montori authored Why We Revolt: A Patient Revolution for Careful and Kind Care, first published in 2017, with a second edition released in 2020. Translations exist in Spanish, Italian, and Greek. The book critiques the dehumanization of modern healthcare and calls for a global movement grounded in unhurried conversations, compassion, and solidarity. It has been recognized for literary and activist excellence, receiving the 2018 PenCraft Award for Literary Excellence.
