= Robert Brian Haynes =

Canadian physician, clinical epidemiologist

Robert Brian Haynes OC
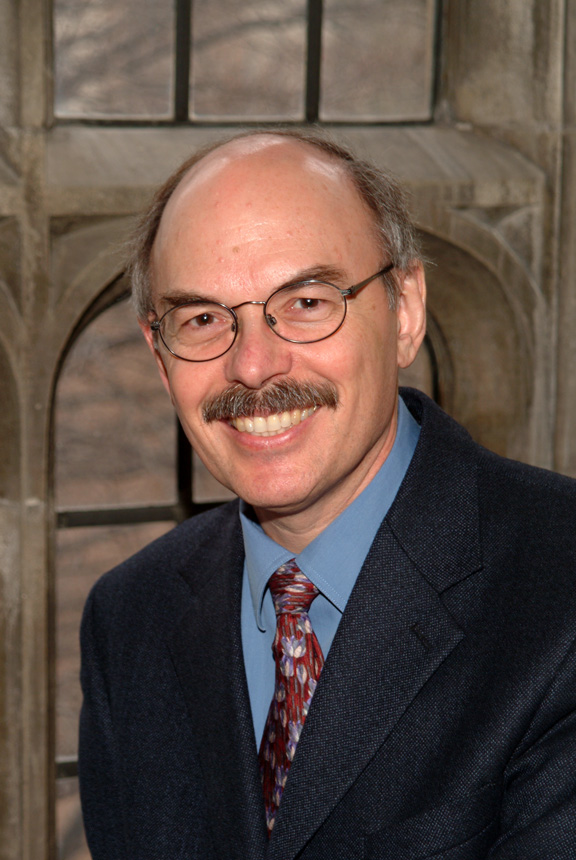
- Born: Calgary
- Occupations: Physician, clinical epidemiologist, researcher and academic
- Awards: Fellow of Royal Society of Canada; Member, Academy of Sciences; Officer, Order of Canada; Roger A. Côté Medal of Excellence in Health Informatics; Hypertension Canada George Fodor Award

Academic background
- Education: University of Alberta; McMaster University

Academic work
- Institutions: McMaster University

Robert Brian Haynes OC is a Canadian physician, clinical epidemiologist, researcher and an academic. He is professor emeritus at McMaster University and one of the founders of evidence-based medicine.

Haynes has published more than 390 articles in peer-reviewed journals and has authored/edited 14 books including Clinical Epidemiology: A Basic Science for Clinical Medicine and Evidence-Based Medicine: How to Practice and Teach. His research interests include improving health care through knowledge translation and applying the findings of high-quality health-care research in clinical practice settings. He is involved with development and testing of evidence-based information products and services in clinical care.

Haynes is an Officer of Order of Canada. His work has been acknowledged through awards, peer elections and honorary fellowships from national and international organizations. Major honors include a National Health Scientist Career Award from Health Canada, the American College of Physicians Rosenthal Award, Hypertension Canada George Fodor Award and Council of Biology Editors Award for Meritorious Achievement. He is fellow of Royal Society of Canada and Royal College of Physicians and Surgeons of Canada and an Honorary Fellow of American Medical Writers Association.

== Education ==
Haynes completed his pre-medical studies from University of Calgary in 1967 and then enrolled in the Faculty of Medicine at University of Alberta until 1971. During this time, he was an MRC Summer Research Fellow in Physiology and Pharmacology and completed his BSc. Degree in 1969. In 1971, he was awarded a gold medal upon his completion of M.D. degree. He completed his M.Sc. and Ph.D., under David Sackett from McMaster University in 1973 and 1975 respectively. In 1977, he became a Fellow of the Royal College of Physicians of Canada (internal medicine).

== Career ==
Right after his Ph.D., Haynes was employed as a Senior Medical Resident at Toronto General Hospital in 1975. From 1977 till 1981, he taught at McMaster University as an Assistant Professor and was promoted to associate professor in 1981. During this time, he was associated with University of Toronto as a Visiting Health Scientist. Haynes taught as a professor at McMaster University from 1985 till 2016 and then retired as professor emeritus. He also chaired the Department of Clinical Epidemiology and Biostatistics at McMaster from 1998 till 2008.

He is an inaugural member of the Cochrane Collaboration Cochrane (organisation), a member of its first board; he started and led the Canadian Cochrane Center and Network.

=== Research and work ===
Haynes' research focuses on improving health care through knowledge translation, clinical epidemiology, application of the validated health care knowledge, development and testing of evidence based information products related to clinical care, randomized trials of medical and surgical procedures. He has also worked on patient compliance with therapeutic regimens.

Haynes published an article in 1976 about improving patient compliance in hypertension. He assigned 38 hypertensive and medically non-compliant steel workers to either control or experimental groups and taught them to measure their blood pressures and create charts about their blood pressures. He also assigned the experimental group weekly visits from a non-professional high school graduate who reinforced regular pill taking behavior. As a result of this experiment, compliance of the control group decreased while it increased in the experimental group. In an article in 1979 about clinical measurements and detection of patient noncompliance, he stressed the importance of measuring patient compliance accurately in order to manage low patient compliance. He devised and evaluated methods of assessing a patient's medical compliance and suggested against using a patient's health beliefs, traits and perceptions as criteria for measurement of compliance. Haynes then shifted his research focus on documenting the problems of evidence handling by practitioners and proposing solutions. He wrote an article explaining the constraints faced by medical practitioners in handling research and clinical evidence. Haynes suggests the use of measurement principles and information tools to reduce the inaccuracy in the data gathering, interpretation, communication and application of the research evidence for patient care.

Haynes worked on evidence retrieval from bibliographic databases and published over 50 articles on the theme of 'Developing optimal search strategies for detecting clinically sound studies in MEDLINE' as well as EMBASE, CINAHL, and PsycLIT. He aimed to design efficient search strategies and conducted a survey about the characteristics of search strategies for studies that would provide higher quality evidence for use by clinical practitioners (medicine, nursing, rehabilitation). He pioneered the use of machine learning to empirically determine the optimal search filters for various types of studies (e.g., prevention, treatment, diagnosis, prognosis, causation, quality improvement and cost-effectiveness). His research validates the empirical search strategies for enhancing the retrieval of articles. After the documentation and retrieval of evidence, Haynes worked on synthesizing the evidence retrieved. He authored a review with his colleagues about the interventions to encourage people to follow medical prescriptions. He summarized the results collected from randomized controlled trials of interventions. The article concluded that there is a dire need for innovation in the methods to assist and encourage patients to follow the medical prescriptions. Haynes' research has resulted in structured abstracts of medical journal articles along with online search filters such as "Clinical Queries" which are often used by MEDLINE, EMBASE and other bibliographic databases. He created the Health Knowledge Refinery at McMaster University's Health Information Research Unit which provides organizations, clinicians and medical textbook publishers and authors with current and most effective evidence for practice. He is one of the originators of Evidence-Based Medicine, led by David Sackett, (along with Gordon Guyatt, Peter Tugwell and Deborah Cook) for which his work has been critically acclaimed.

== Awards and honors ==
- 1985 – Fellow, Academy of Behavioral Medicine Research
- 1992 – Fellow, American College of Medical Informatics
- 1998 – American College of Physicians Rosenthal Award for notable contributions to improve clinical care in internal medicine
- 1998 – Council of Biology Editors Award for Meritorious Achievement
- 1998 – Honorary Fellow, US Medical Library Association
- 2000 – First Prize, Basis of Medicine Section, British Medical Association Book Competition
- 2001 – Honorary Fellow, American Medical Writers Association
- 2004 – Senior Investigator Award, Canadian Society for Internal Medicine, 2004
- 2006 – Master, American College of Physicians
- 2007 – Fellow, Royal Society of Canada, Academy of Sciences
- 2009 – Member, US National Academy of Medicine
- 2010 – Officer, Order of Canada
- 2010 – Roger A. Côté Medal of Excellence in Health Informatics for 2010, National Institutes of Health Informatics
- 2013 – American College of Physicians Ontario Laureate Award
- 2013 – Hypertension Canada George Fodor Award
- 2017 - McMaster University Faculty of Health Sciences Community of Distinction
- 2022 - Distinguished Alumni Award, University of Alberta, 2022
- 2025 - Honorary degree, Doctor of Science, May, 2025, McMaster University

== Bibliography ==
=== Selected books ===
- Compliance in Health Care. Johns Hopkins University Press, Baltimore, 1979
- Clinical epidemiology: a basic science for clinical medicine. Little, Brown, Boston, (1985)
- Evidence-Based Medicine: how to practice and teach EBM. (1997)
- Evidence-Based Medicine: how to practice and teach EBM. 2nd edition. London: Churchill Livingstone (2000)
- Evidence-Based Medicine: how to practice and teach EBM. 3nd edition (2005)
- Clinical Epidemiology: How to do clinical practice research. (2005)
- Evidence-Based Medicine: how to practice and teach EBM. 4th edition. (2011)
- Evidence-Based Medicine: how to practice and teach EBM. 5th edition (2019)

=== Selected articles ===
- Nieuwlaat R, Wilczynski N, Navarro T, Hobson N, Jeffery R, Keepanasseril A, Agoritsas T, Mistry N, Iorio A, Jack S, Sivaramalingam B, Iserman E, Mustafa RA, Jedraszewski D, Cotoi C, Haynes RB. Interventions for enhancing medication adherence. Cochrane Database of Systematic Reviews 2014, Issue 2 . Art. No.: CD000011.
- Davis DA, Thomson MA, Oxman AD, Haynes RB. Changing physician performance: a systematic review of the effect of educational strategies. JAMA 1995;274:700-5.
- Garg AX, Adhikari N, McDonald H, Rosas-Arellano MP, Devereaux PJ, Beyene J, Sam J, Haynes RB. Effects of computerized clinical decision support systems on practitioner performance and patient outcomes: a systematic review. JAMA 2005;293:1323-38.
- Oxman AD, Thomson MA, Davis DA, Haynes RB. No magic bullets: a systematic review of 102 trials of interventions to improve professional practice. Can Med Assoc J. 1995;153:1423-31.
- Cook DJ, Mulrow C, Haynes RB. Systematic reviews: synthesis of best evidence for clinical decisions. Ann Intern Med 1997;126:376-80.
- Hunt DL, Haynes RB, Hanna SE, Smith K. Effects of computer-based clinical decision support systems on physician performance and patient outcomes: a systematic review. JAMA 1998;280:1339-46.
- Haynes RB, Montague P, Oliver T, McKibbon KA, Brouwers MC, Kanani R. Interventions for helping patients to follow prescriptions for medications. (Cochrane Review) In: The Cochrane Library, Issue 3, 1999. Oxford: Update Software.
- O'Brien MA, Rogers S, Jamtvedt G, Oxman AD, Odgaard-Jensen J, Kristofferson DT, Forsetlund L, Bainbridge D, Freemantle N, Davis DA, Haynes RB, Harvey EL. Educational outreach visits: effects on professional practice and health care outcomes. Cochrane Database Syst Rev 2007 Oct 17;(4):CD000409.
- Haynes RB, McKibbon KA, Kanani R. Systematic review of randomised trials of interventions to assist patients to follow prescriptions for medications. Lancet 1996;348:383-6.
- Haynes RB, Wilczynski NL, McKibbon KA, Walker CJ, Sinclair JC. Developing optimal search strategies for detecting clinically sound studies in MEDLINE. J Amer Med Inform Assoc 1994;1: 447–58.
- Sackett DL, Rosenberg WMC, Gray JAM, Haynes RB. Evidence-based medicine: what it is and what it isn't. BMJ 1996;312:71-2.
