= The Appointment =

The Appointment may refer to:

- The Appointment (1969 film), a psychological drama
- The Appointment (1981 film), a British horror film
- The Appointment (novel), a 1997 German novel by Herta Müller
- The Appointment (Picasso), a 1900 pastel on paper by Pablo Picasso

== See also ==
- Appointment (disambiguation)
