= Normalization process model =

Sociological model

The normalization process model is a sociological model, developed by Carl R. May, that describes the adoption of new technologies in health care. The model provides framework for process evaluation using three components – actors, objects, and contexts – that are compared across four constructs: Interactional workability, relational integration, skill-set workability, and contextual integration. This model helped build the normalization process theory.

== Development ==
The normalization process model is a theory that explains how new technologies are embedded in health care work. The model was developed by Carl R. May and co-workers, and is an empirically derived grounded theory in medical sociology and science and technology studies (STS), based on qualitative methods. Carl May developed the model after he appeared as a witness at a British House of Commons Health Committee Inquiry on New Medical Technologies in the NHS in 2005. He asked how new technologies became routinely embedded, and taken-for-granted, in everyday work, in view of the increasing corporate organization and regulation of healthcare. The model explains embedding by looking at the work that people do to make it possible.

The model is a theory in sociology that fits well with macro approaches to innovation like the diffusion of innovations theory developed by Everett Rogers. Although the normalization process model is limited in scope to healthcare settings recent work by May and colleagues has led to the development of normalization process theory, which presents a general sociological theory of implementation and integration of technological and organizational innovations. Normalization process theory has now superseded the more limited normalization process model.

The normalization process model provides a framework for process evaluation and also for comparative studies of complex interventions, especially of randomized controlled trials. Clinical trials and other evaluations of healthcare interventions often focus on the complex relationships between actors, objects and contexts, making a simple explanatory model, that fits well with other frameworks a necessary tool for clinical and health service researchers. In the normalization process model, a complex intervention is defined as a deliberately initiated attempt to introduce new, or modify existing, patterns of collective action in health care.

=== Components ===
A complex intervention has three kinds of components:

1. Actors are the individuals and groups that encounter each other in health care settings. They can include physicians, other health professionals, managers, patients, and family members. The aims of interventions aimed at actors are often to change people's behaviour and its intended outcomes.
2. Objects are the institutionally sanctioned means by which knowledge and practice are enacted. They can include procedures, protocols, hardware, and software The aims of interventions aimed at objects often include changing people's expertise and actions.
3. Contexts are the physical, organisational, institutional, and legislative structures that enable and constrain, and resource and realize, people and procedures. The aims of interventions aimed at contexts are often to change the ways that people organize their work to achieve goals in health care (or other) services.

==== Constructs ====
The normalization process model explains the embedding of complex interventions by reference to four constructs of collective action that are demonstrated to promote or inhibit the operationalization and embedding of complex interventions (interactional workability, relational integration, skill-set workability, and contextual integration) in a rigorous and sound theory.

1. Interactional workability: This describes how a complex intervention is operationalized by the people using it. A complex intervention will affect co-operative interactions over work (its congruence), and the normal pattern of outcomes of this work (its disposal). Therefore: a complex intervention is disposed to normalization if it confers an interactional advantage in flexibly accomplishing congruence and disposal of work.
2. Relational integration: This describes how knowledge and work is mediated and understood within the social networks of people around it. A complex intervention will affect not only the knowledge required by its users (its accountability), but also the ways that they understand the actions of people around them (its confidence). Therefore: a complex intervention is disposed to normalization if it equals or improves accountability and confidence within networks.
3. Skill-set workability: This describes the distribution and conduct of work in a division of labor. A complex intervention will affect the ways that work is defined and distributed (its allocation), and the ways in which it is undertaken and evaluated (its performance). Therefore: a complex intervention is disposed to normalization if it is calibrated to an agreed skill-set at a recognizable location in the division of labor.
4. Contextual integration: This refers to the incorporation of work within an organizational setting. A complex intervention will affect the mechanisms that link work to existing structures and procedures (its execution), and for allocating and organizing resources for them (its realization). Therefore: a complex intervention is disposed to normalization if it confers an advantage on an organization in flexibly executing and realizing work.
