= Robert Haynes =

Robert Haynes may refer to:

- Robert Haynes (geneticist) (1931–1998), Canadian geneticist and biophysicist
- Robert Brian Haynes, Canadian physician, clinical epidemiologist, and academic
- Robert Haynes (cricketer) (born 1964), West Indian cricketer
