= Karl May (disambiguation) =

Karl or Carl May may refer to:

- Karl May, German novelist, writer, musician, and teacher
- Karl May (film), film about the writer
- 15728 Karlmay, asteroid named after the writer
- Karl May School, Saint Petersburg, Russia
- Carl R. May (born 1961), British sociologist

== See also ==
- Carl Mays, baseball player
