= Minimally disruptive medicine =

Patient care approach

Minimally disruptive medicine is an approach to patient care in chronic illness proposed by Carl R May, Victor Montori, and Frances Mair. In a 2009 article in the British Medical Journal they argued that the burden of illness (the pathophysiological and psychosocial impact of disease on the affected person) has its counterpart in the burden of treatment (the workload delegated to the patient by health professionals, which may include self care and self-monitoring, managing therapeutic regimens, organizing doctors' visits, tests, and insurance). As medical responses to illness have become more sophisticated, the burden of treatment has grown, and includes increasingly complex techniques and health technologies (such as telecare) that must be routinely incorporated in everyday life by their users. minimally disruptive medicine is an approach to designing patient care that seeks to consider the effects of treatment work, and in particular to prevent overburdening patients. Overburdening leads, May, Montori and Mair argued, to structurally induced non-compliance with treatment, in which it becomes progressively more difficult for patients – especially older patients with multiple long-term conditions – to meet the demands that therapeutic regimens place upon them. minimally disruptive medicine has a theoretical basis in Normalization Process Theory, which explains the processes by which treatment regimens and other ensembles of cognitive, behavioural and technical practices are routinely incorporated in everyday life.

== Burden of treatment ==
The burden of treatment represents the challenges associated with everything patients do to care for themselves. For example: visits to the doctor, medical tests, treatment management, and lifestyle changes... Patients with chronic conditions find it difficult to integrate everything asked of them by their healthcare providers in their everyday life (between work, family life and/or other obligations). Treatment burden is associated, independently of illnesses, with adherence to therapeutic care and could affect hospitalization and survival rates.
Treatment burden for patients exhibiting multiple chronic conditions can be assessed using validated tools that may help in the development of treatment strategies that are both efficient and acceptable for patients.
