= Users' Guides to the Medical Literature =

Book by Gordon Guyatt and Drummond Rennie

Users' Guides to the Medical Literature: A Manual for Evidence-Based Clinical Practice
- First edition
- Authors: Gordon Guyatt, Drummond Rennie
- Series: Users' Guides to the Medical Literature
- Subject: Medicine
- Publisher: American Medical Association
- Publication date: 2001
- ISBN: 978-0071790710

The Users' Guides to the Medical Literature is a series of articles originally published in the Journal of the American Medical Association, later rewritten and compiled in a textbook, now in its third edition. The guides provide practical, clinician-friendly advice on all aspects of evidence-based medicine.

== As articles ==
During the late 1970s, a group of clinical epidemiologists at McMaster University including David Sackett prepared a series of articles to assist clinicians interpreting clinical research. These articles, introducing the term "critical appraisal", appeared in the Canadian Medical Association Journal beginning in 1981.

In 1990, Gordon Guyatt introduced the term "evidence-based medicine" to stress the role of rigorous, systematic evidence from clinical research in conjunction with patients’ values and preferences in clinical decision-making. A group of academic physicians subsequently formed the international Evidence-based Medicine Working Group and published a 1992 article announcing the "new paradigm" of evidence-based medicine.

The Evidence-based Medicine Working Group decided to build on the popular series in the Canadian Medical Association Journal by creating a more practical approach to applying the medical literature to clinical practice. Championed by Drummond Rennie, an editor of the Journal of the American Medical Association, the result was the Users' Guides. The guides originally consisted of 25 topics, covered in a series of 32 articles published in the Journal of the American Medical Association between 1993 and 2000, describing approaches to different types of medical questions and the study designs that may answer them.

== Books ==
Guyatt and Rennie edited the articles and compiled them to form a book titled Users' Guides to the Medical Literature: A Manual for Evidence-Based Clinical Practice.

The books teach a systematic approach to reading and applying the medical literature to individual patient care. It focuses on three questions: whether new information is likely to be valid, what the information says about patient care, and how the information can be used. To demonstrate the clinical relevance of the suggested approach, each section begins with a practical clinical scenario. The chapter is then structured around identifying the best available evidence and applying the three key questions to the evidence, in the context of the clinical scenario. Each chapter concludes with a resolution of the scenario.

Most of the book chapters are based on specific types of clinical questions, including questions of therapy, harm, diagnosis, and prognosis. Other chapters deal with general skills that are important for all clinical questions, such as "Finding the Evidence", "Summarizing the Evidence", and "Moving From Evidence to Action".

The Users' Guides come in two book versions: the Essentials introduces the concepts of evidence-based medicine (EBM) with which every practicing clinician should be familiar, while the Manual provides a more comprehensive, in-depth exploration of EBM concepts for clinicians seeking a deeper understanding, or for those who wish to teach EBM.

== Website ==
The complete text of the second edition of the Users' Guides Manual is available online by subscription. The JAMAevidence website also includes a large number of calculators, worksheets and additional aids for the practice of EBM, including the updated and edited collection of another long-running JAMA article series, The Rational Clinical Examination: Evidence-based Clinical Diagnosis.
