= APPT =

APPT may refer to:

- Asia Pacific Poker Tour
- Association of Pickleball Players Tour
- APPT or Association of Small People, a French dwarfism organization (L'Association des Personnes de Petite Taille)

== See also ==
- Appointment (disambiguation)
- APTT
