= Appointment =

Appointment may refer to:

== Law ==
- The prerogative power of a government official or executive to select persons to fill an honorary position or employment in the government (political appointments, poets laureate)
- Power of appointment, the legal ability of a testator to select another person to dispose of the testator's property
- Recess appointment, a method of filling vacancies under U.S. federal law
- Appointment, a form of royal warrant
- Political appointments in the United States
- List of positions filled by presidential appointment with Senate confirmation
  - Nomination and confirmation to the Supreme Court of the United States
- Judicial appointments in Canada, made by the federal government or provincial government. Superior and federal court judges are appointed by federal government, while inferior courts are appointed by the provincial government
- Warrant of appointment, an official document presented by the president of Ireland to persons upon appointment to certain offices

== Religion ==
- Papal appointment, the oldest method for the selection of the pope
- Appointment of Catholic bishops, in the Catholic Church is a complicated process
- Appointment of Church of England bishops, the selection and installation process of bishops in the Church of England
- Letter of appointment (Mormonism), in Church of Jesus Christ of Latter-day Saints history

== Others ==
- Appointment to the Order of Canada, the process by which Canadians citizens or certain foreign persons are inducted into the Order of Canada, an act that is Canada's second highest civilian honour within the country's system of honours
- Court appointment, one of the traditional positions within a royal, ducal, or noble household
- Appointment, a means of funding postdoctoral research
- A time designated for a meeting with a professional on a schedule

== See also ==
- The Appointment (disambiguation)
