= Gordon Guyatt =

Canadian physician

Gordon Henry Guyatt
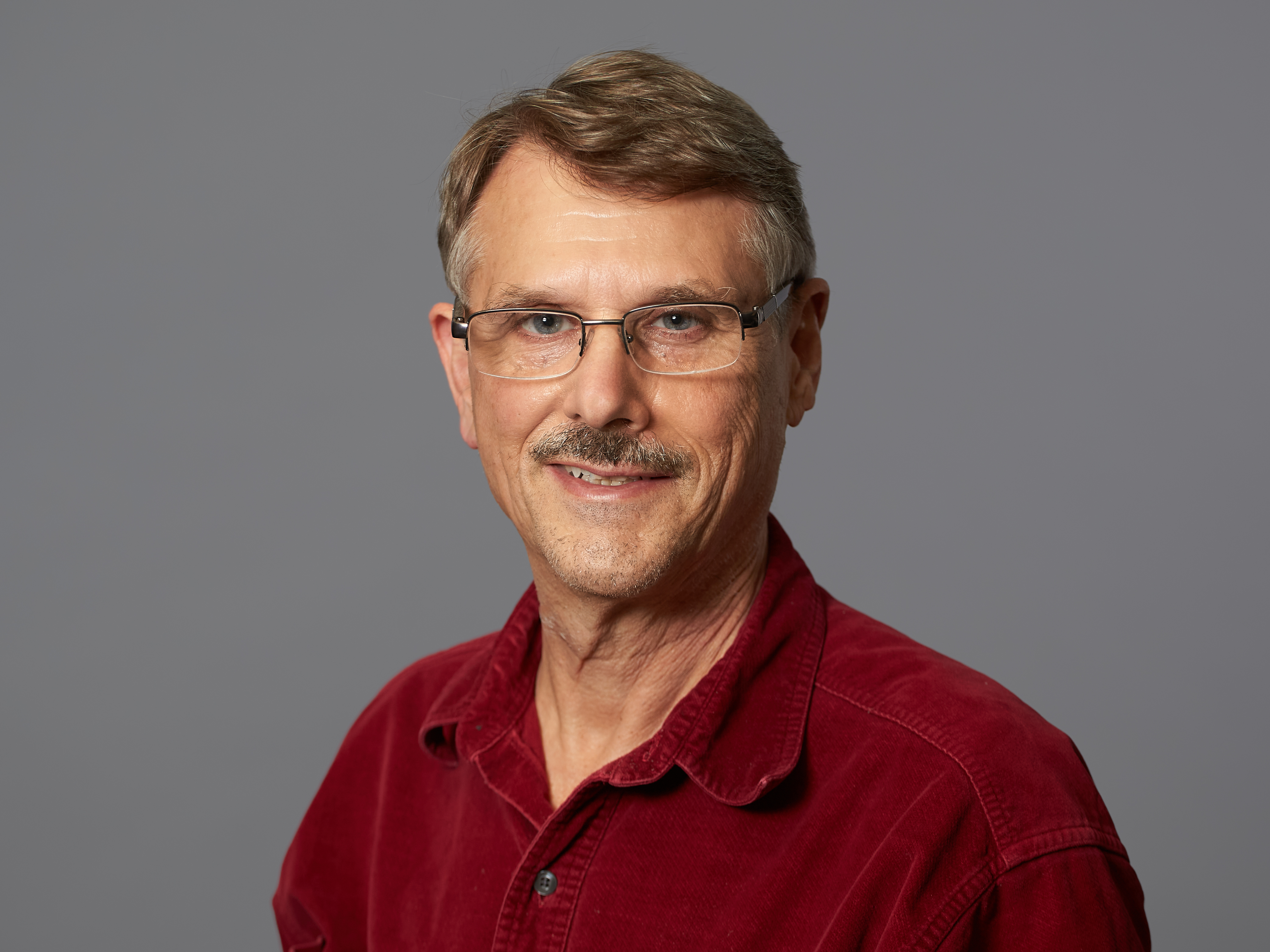
- Born: November 11, 1953 (age 72); Hamilton, Ontario, Canada
- Education: University of Toronto (B.Sc.); McMaster University (M.Sc.); McMaster University (M.D.)
- Known for: Pioneer in evidence-based medicine
- Scientific career
- Fields: Medicine
- Institutions: McMaster University

Gordon Henry Guyatt (born November 11, 1953) is a Canadian physician who is a professor at McMaster University in Hamilton, Ontario. He is known for his leadership in evidence-based medicine, a term that first appeared in a single-author paper he published in 1991. Subsequently, a 1992 JAMA article led by Guyatt proved instrumental in bringing the concept of evidence-based medicine to the world's attention. Guyatt's concerns with the role of the medical system, social justice, and medical reform remain central issues that he promoted in tandem with his medical work. He was named to the Canadian Medical Hall of Fame in 2015.

== Early life ==
Guyatt was born and raised in Hamilton, home to McMaster University. On his father's side, he was the son of a deeply-rooted Protestant Hamilton family. His grandfather was a Hamilton physician and his father, a lawyer. On his mother's side, his roots were in Europe: his mother was a Czech Jew and Auschwitz and Belsen concentration camp survivor who immigrated to Hamilton.

Guyatt attended the University of Toronto where he obtained a Bachelor of Science. He then obtained his medical degree at McMaster University Medical School and certified as a general internist. Later, Guyatt received a Master of Science in Design, Management, and Evaluation (now known as Health Research Methodology) from McMaster University.

== Career ==
Guyatt has published over 1200 peer-reviewed articles in scientific journals, many in leading medical journals such as The New England Journal of Medicine, The Lancet, Journal of the American Medical Association, and The BMJ. According to the Web of Science, his work has been cited over 100,000 times; according to Google Scholar over 660,000 times. In a Google scholar tabulation of the world's most cited scientists, he is listed 14th.

His writing has included many educational articles regarding evidence-based medicine. Guyatt is the co-editor of the Users' Guides to the Medical Literature, a comprehensive set of journal articles and a textbook for clinicians who wish to incorporate evidence-based medicine principles into their practices. His contributions to quality of life research, randomized trials, meta-analysis and clinical practice guidelines have been considered groundbreaking. He has also written extensively on health care policy in the popular press. Guyatt previously published a regular health column on the editorial pages of the Winnipeg Free Press, and prior to that in The Hamilton Spectator.

In 1979, Guyatt co-founded the Medical Reform Group, a Canadian organization of physicians and medical students devoted to universal public health care. Some of his popular press columns were archived at the MRC website. The group continued its work for 35 years, after which the Canadian Doctors for Medicare has led the Canadian progressive medical community in addressing the issues that were central to the Medical Reform Group.

=== McMaster internal medicine (1990–1997) ===
From 1990 to 1997, Guyatt directed the residency program at McMaster University that trains physicians to be specialists in internal medicine. He used that program as a laboratory for developing and testing approaches to residency education focused on evidence-based approaches to care delivery. Since 1993, Guyatt has chaired the Evidence-Based Clinical Practice Workshop at McMaster University, an annual workshop on teaching and incorporating evidence-based principles into clinical practice.

In 1996, Guyatt received the McMaster University President's Award for Excellence in Teaching (Course or Resource Design).

=== GRADE approach (2000) ===
Along with Holger Jens Schünemann, Guyatt is the co-chair of the Grading of Recommendations Assessment, Development and Evaluation (GRADE) working group that began in the year 2000 as an informal collaboration of people with an interest in addressing the shortcomings of grading systems in clinical practice guidelines and systematic reviews. Guyatt played a key role in the development and refinement of the GRADE approach, a sensible and transparent structure for grading quality (or certainty) of evidence and strength of recommendations. The GRADE approach is now considered the standard in systematic review and guideline development with over 100 health care organizations worldwide having adopted the approach, including the World Health Organization, Centers for Disease Control, American College of Physicians and the Cochrane Collaboration.

=== BMJ rankings (2007–2010) ===
In 2007, The BMJ launched an international election for the most important contributions to healthcare. Evidence-based medicine came 7th, ahead of the computer and medical imaging.

In 2010, he was one of 10 candidates short-listed (from a list of 117 nominees) for the BMJ Lifetime Achievement Award and ultimately finished second.

=== Distinguished University Professor (2010–present) ===
In 2010, Guyatt was conferred the title of "Distinguished University Professor", the highest and rarest academic rank held by a full-time faculty member at McMaster University, in the department of Clinical Epidemiology & Biostatistics) and Medicine. This department later became the Department of Health Research Methods, Evidence and Impact (HEI).

In 2018 Guyatt was forced to apologize for saying in front of a Black Health Alliance panel: "I’m grateful to be here instead of an Indigenous woman."

In 2019 Guyatt's team performed a GRADE study on the notion that eating red meat causes cancer and other negative health outcomes. The GRADE study showed that evidence was of very low to low certainty and provided a weak recommendation to continue current levels of red meat consumption.

==== Gender-affirming care review ====
In 2021, the Society for Evidence-Based Gender Medicine (SEGM) approached a member of Guyatt's team about doing a GRADE review of gender-affirming care. McMaster University accepted $250,000 to fund the research at the Department of Health Research Methods, Evidence, and Impact (HEI). This HEI-SEGM contract ended in 2024. As a result of the contract the HEI team published three papers on the results of their contracted reviews: two in Archives of Disease in Childhood, and one in Plastic and Reconstructive Surgery.

Prior to completing the GRADE review of the evidence in the HEI-SEGM contract, in 2023 Guyatt criticized the American Academy of Pediatrics's position statement re-affirming its 2018 policy supporting gender-affirming care.

Since May 2024, Guyatt has opposed withholding gender-affirming care and argued that SEGM places a low value on patient autonomy.

In July 2025, The Spectator published an opinion piece calling for McMaster to break ties with SEGM. One author later stated "the research is, by definition, not independent of the funder, because they selected the question". Later that year, Guyatt and other members of the department released a statement that SEGM initially "appeared to us as non-trans, cisgender researchers to be legitimately evidence-based", that HEI would not work with SEGM going forward, and that it was 'profoundly misguided' to portray gender-affirming care as bad care or as driven by ideology. The HEI authors also donated to Egale Canada, a Canadian charity founded by the LGBTQ community.

In September 2025 Guyatt stated that using the HEI-SEGM review to deny gender-affirming care is a "gross misuse of our work and is unconscionable".

=== Notable awards and honours ===
He is a Fellow of the Canadian Academy of Health Sciences.

In 2011, he was appointed as an Officer of the Order of Canada "for his contributions to the advancement of evidence-based medicine and its teaching."

In 2012, he was elected a Fellow of the Royal Society of Canada.

In 2015, he was made a member of the Canadian Medical Hall of Fame.

In 2022, he received honorary doctorate at the Faculty of Medicine of the University of Helsinki, Helsinki, Finland.

In 2022, the Einstein Foundation Berlin honored him with the Einstein Foundation Award for Promoting Quality in Research in the category international Individual Award. His acceptance speech was entitled "How to Avoid Being Mislead (sic) by the Medical Literature".

In 2024, Friends of Canadian Institutes of Health Research (FCIHR) awarded him the Henry G. Friesen International Prize in Health Research, which recognizes exceptional innovation by a visionary health leader of international stature.

=== Selected textbooks ===
- Guyatt G, Rennie D, Meade M, Cook D. Users' Guides to the Medical Literature: A Manual for Evidence-Based Clinical Practice, Second Edition. McGraw-Hill Professional, 2008.
- Haynes RB, Sackett DL, Guyatt GH, Tugwell P. Clinical Epidemiology: How to Do Clinical Practice Research, Third Edition. Philadelphia: Lippincott, Williams and Wilkins, 2006.
- DiCenso A, Guyatt G, Ciliska D. Evidence-Based Nursing: A Guide to Clinical Practice. Mosby, 2005.

== Politics ==
Guyatt ran as the New Democratic Party (NDP) candidate in the 2004, 2006 and 2008 Canadian federal elections in the riding of Ancaster—Dundas—Flamborough—Westdale and previously ran for the NDP in the 2000 federal election in the former riding of Ancaster—Dundas—Flamborough—Aldershot.
