= Holger Jens Schünemann =

German-canadian physician scientist and epidemiologist (born 1967)

Holger Jens Schünemann (born 8 March 1967 in Braunschweig, Germany) is a physician and professor of Preventive Medicine and Public Health and professor emeritus of medicine and Clinical epidemiology. Since 1 December 2023 he is Director of the Clinical Epidemiology and Research Center (CERC) at Humanitas University. From 1 February 2009 to 30 June 2019 he was the chair of the Department of Health Research Methods, Evidence, and Impact (formerly the "Department of Clinical Epidemiology and Biostatistics") at McMaster University in Hamilton, Canada, where he is an active emeritus professor.

He also holds or held positions as professor at the University at Buffalo, Department of Medicine, US; visiting professor at the University of Freiburg, Germany; director of Cochrane Canada; and director of the McMaster GRADE Centre.

== Education ==
Schünemann studied epidemiology (M.Sc. in epidemiology, 1997) during his postdoctoral fellowship in molecular and cellular biology. He then conducted population-based studies on the association between oxidative stress, micronutrients and respiratory health with a promotion to a Ph.D. degree (epidemiology & community medicine, 2000) and also completed training in internal medicine and preventive medicine at the Medical School of Hannover, Germany, and at the University at Buffalo, where he joined the faculty in 2000. In 1994 he received a doctor medicinae degree with a sports and exercise physiology thesis on carbon dioxide transport and exchange after obtaining his medical degree from the Medical School of Hannover, Germany.

== Career ==
After four years on the faculty at the University at Buffalo, from 2005 to 2009 Schünemann was at the Italian National Cancer Center in Rome, Italy, before moving to McMaster University as a full-time professor and becoming chair of clinical epidemiology and biostatistics. In his second term as chair of this prestigious department, he led the strategic plan to refocus the department as the "Department of Health Research Methods, Evidence, and Impact (HEI)", a first of its kind.

Schünemann's scientific work focuses on evidence synthesis, quality of life research and the development and presentation of healthcare recommendations spanning several disciplines from Clinical Medicine to Public Health.

Schünemann has authored or co-authored over 1000 peer-reviewed publications. He has been named by Thomson Reuters and then Clarivate as one of the most influential 3,000 scientific minds of current times across scientific disciplines (from agriculture to zoology) annually since 2015 and is listed amongst the 500 most highly cited scientists.

Schünemann is past chair of the Guidelines International Network's Board of Trustees and of the GRADE Working Group.

=== Guidelines development, ecosystem of health-decision making and GRADE methodology ===
As a key contributor to the revised methods for WHO guideline development in 2006, and the Institute of Medicine statement on trustworthy guidelines in 2011, Schünemann has co-led the reshaping of guideline development methodology. He has co-chaired the GRADE Working Group since 2009 and in 2024 became its sole chair, for which he coined the name GRADE and has played a major role in disseminating its spirit of collaboration, openness, the advancement of evidence assessment, and the creation of better health care recommendations. GRADE is an acronym for Grading of Recommendations Assessment, Development and Evaluation. The result of the group's efforts is a common, sensible, and transparent approach to grading the quality (or certainty) of evidence and grading the strength of healthcare recommendations – this is called the GRADE approach. It includes an approach to trustworthy rapid development of guideline recommendations and their transparent development to the context, called GRADE Adolopment.

Schünemann's work also focuses on the practical application of scientific evidence by researchers and clinicians, through co-inventing tools like the GRADEpro guideline development tool, and pioneering the use of GRADE Evidence to Decision tables, now reworked as GRADE Evidence to Decision Frameworks. He co-lead the work on creating synergy in the ecosystem of health-decision making across actors which the group coined "theory of everything in health decision-making". This work is advanced in part through Schünemann's work as director of the WHO Collaborating Center for Evidence-Based Decision-Making in Health at Humanitas University. In the context of health decision-making, which requires careful balancing of benefits and harms (that are inevitable), and the guideline science he recoined the principle of "do no harm" into "do no net harm".

During the COVID-19 pandemic he created with his colleagues a "go to" crowdsourcing portal for developers of healthcare recommendations in collaboration with the Guideline International Network. This approach is now known as recommendation mapping.

He also is the head of the steering group for the INGUIDE Guideline Development Training & Certification Program.

== Books ==
Neumann I, Schünemann H, editors; The GRADE Book [Internet]. Version 1.0. Milan: GRADE Working Group; 2024. Available from: https://book.gradepro.org/. ISBN 979-12-243-3917-5
