= The Appointment (Picasso) =

Painting by Pablo Picasso

The Appointment is a 1900 pastel on paper painting by Pablo Picasso, now in the Pushkin Museum in Moscow.

== History and description ==
In September 1899, the eighteen-year-old Picasso was in Paris, looking for subjects and themes of everyday life that would allow him to experiment with new artistic tendencies.

The Appointment shows a subject typically drawn from Parisian nightlife, with the scene of a couple embracing and kissing, while standing in a dimly lit attic, in front of a bed that suggests a subsequent amorous encounter. Little is revealed to the viewer's: the faces of the protagonists are hidden by their embrace. However, the contrast between the soft but supple slenderness of the woman and the strong and solid grip of the man is evident, and his figure is composed of stronger shading and straighter lines (note the massive square shape of the legs).

In the small drawing, the asymmetrical but expertly composed composition is striking, with the contrast between the background and the male figure made up of predominantly blue and cold green colors, and the female figure, set in warm shades of red and on the bright white of her petticoat. The brushstrokes are clearly visible and form a sinuous trend linked to the shapes of the figures and objects: it is highly probable that Picasso had been influenced by the lithographs of Edvard Munch.
