= Implementation Science =

- Discipline: health care
- Language: English

Publication details
- History: 2006–present
- Publisher: BioMed Central (United States)
- Open access: Yes
- Impact factor: 8.8 (2023)

Standard abbreviations
- ISO 4: Implement. Sci.

Indexing
- ISSN: 1748-5908 (print); 1748-5908 (web)
- OCLC no.: 667871606

Links
- Journal homepage; Online access

Implementation Science is an open access peer-reviewed academic journal in healthcare that was established in 2006. It focuses on studies of implementation research from the clinical, biomedical, social and health services sciences, as well as contributions on methodology and theory, selected reviews, essays, and invited editorials. The editors are Michel Wensing (University of Heidelberg) and Paul Wilson (University of Manchester). In 2018, the journal had an impact factor of 4.525, placing it #11 out of 98 journals in the category Healthcare Sciences & Services.

== Abstracting and indexing ==
The journal is abstracted and indexed in

- Citebase
- Current Contents
- DOAJ
- EmCare
- MEDLINE
- OAIster
- PubMed
- PubMed Central
- Science Citation Index
- Science Citation Index Expanded
- SCImago
- Scopus
- Social Sciences Citation Index
- SOCOLAR
- Zetoc
