= David Sackett =

American-Canadian physician

- Born: David Lawrence Sackett; November 17, 1934; Chicago, Illinois, US
- Died: May 13, 2015 (aged 80); Markdale, Ontario, Canada
- Known for: evidence-based medicine
- Awards: Order of Canada

Academic background
- Education: University of Illinois College of Medicine; Harvard University

Academic work
- Institutions: McMaster University; University of Oxford

David Lawrence Sackett OC FRSC (November 17, 1934 – May 13, 2015) was an American-Canadian physician and a pioneer in evidence-based medicine. He is known as one of the fathers of Evidence-Based Medicine. He founded the first department of clinical epidemiology in Canada at McMaster University, and the Oxford Centre for Evidence-Based Medicine. He is well known for his textbooks Clinical Epidemiology and Evidence-Based Medicine.

One of his more famous quotes is: "Half of what you learn in medical school is dead wrong."

== Education ==
Sackett obtained his medical degree at the University of Illinois College of Medicine, and a Master of Science in Epidemiology from Harvard University.

== Career ==
David Sackett made seminal contributions to the science of health care and the teaching and practice of medicine. He did so through vision (about how to improve health care through research), innovation (in research methods for health care and education of researchers and clinicians), and engendering collegiality and collaboration.

Among his randomized clinical trials, and in collaboration with colleagues, he was a Principal Investigator in the trials that showed, for the first time anywhere, the life-saving benefits of aspirin for patients with threatened stroke and threatened heart attack, that surgically repairing the "hardened" arteries of patients with threatened stroke (carotid endarterectomy) prevented both stroke and death, and the ability of nurse practitioners to provide effective, high-quality primary care. In addition, his "debunking" trials showed the futility of traditional health education in helping hypertensive patients take their medicine, and that a popular "bypass" operation for stroke-prone individuals did more harm than good.

He repeated his residency in medicine some 20 years after first training because, although a professor in medical school, he 'wasn't a good enough doctor.'"

His contributions to research methodology included ways to detect and reduce bias in clinical research, and ways to design, conduct, and report randomized clinical trials. David Sackett is widely regarded as one of 3 "fathers" of modern clinical epidemiology (along with Archie Cochrane of the UK and Alvan Feinstein of the USA). Clinical epidemiology is a research discipline based on the methods of epidemiology (and other scientific pursuits, notably biostatistics, the behavioral sciences, and health economics), applied to understanding the nature of health care problems and, especially, their management. Thus, it is a bridging discipline, linking research to clinical practice. Typical topics include the cause, diagnosis, course (prognosis, clinical prediction), prevention, treatment, and amelioration of health disorders, and the improvement and cost-effectiveness of health services.

Sackett was the founding chair of the first department of Clinical Epidemiology and Biostatistics in the world at McMaster University in Hamilton, Ontario, in 1967, and extensively contributed to the development of research methods through his books and published articles, as well as through education and lectures at McMaster and internationally. He promoted transformation of clinical research into a scientifically sound and practical, multidisciplinary "team sport" and has been associated with improving the quality of health care research and clinical practice.

In the late 1970s, Sackett began to popularize the use of clinical epidemiologic principles in the practice of medicine and other health care disciplines, working with his former students, Brian Haynes, Peter Tugwell, Gordon Guyatt and eventually many other clinician scientists at McMaster University and around the world. Initially termed "critical appraisal of the medical literature", to help practitioners keep up with scientific advances in health care, this became "evidence-based medicine". Evidence-Based Medicine: An Oral History documents some of the highlights of the role that he and others played in the evolution of EBM. Sackett led the writing of seminal articles on clinical disagreement and how to read clinical journals books, beginning in 1980 in the Canadian Medical Association Journal, followed by seminal books, beginning in 1985 with Clinical Epidemiology: A Basic Science for Clinical Medicine.

In 1994, Sackett accepted an invitation from (later, Sir) Muir Gray of the UK National Health Service to start the first Centre for Evidence-Based Medicine in Britain, as Professor of Clinical Epidemiology, Nuffield Department of Clinical Medicine, University of Oxford.

Clinically, Sackett practiced as a general internist and was appointed Physician-in-Chief of Medicine at the Chedoke-McMaster Hospital in Hamilton in 1986, then Head of the Division of General Internal Medicine in 1988. In Oxford, he practiced as Honorary NHS Consultant in General Medicine.

Retired from clinical practice in 1999, he returned to Canada and created the Trout Research & Education Centre, where he read, researched, wrote and taught about randomized clinical trials. He also authored, with Sharon Straus, the definitive guide about mentorship for clinician scientists. Along the way, he has published 10 books, chapters for about 50 others, and about 300 papers in medical and scientific journals. He died on May 13, 2015 in Markdale, Ontario.

== Honours ==
David Sackett won many awards, honorary degrees and accolades for his research, teaching and writing. Notably, in 1992, he was made a Fellow of the Royal Society of Canada. In 2000, he was inducted into the Canadian Medical Hall of Fame. In 2001, he was appointed Officer of the Order of Canada. In 2009, he was awarded the Gairdner Foundation Wightman Award. He was awarded honorary doctorates from the University of Bern, Switzerland, and McMaster University, Canada, and appointed as Honorary Professor of Clinical Epidemiology, at the West China University of Medical Sciences, and Adjunct Professor of the University of Ottawa.

== Selected publications ==
- David L Sackett: Interview in 2014 and 2015. Haynes RB (editor). 2015. https://fhs.mcmaster.ca/ceb/docs/David_L_Sackett_Interview_in_2014_2015.pdf
- Sackett DL, Haynes RB (editors). Compliance with Therapeutic Regimens. Baltimore: Johns Hopkins University Press, 1976.
- Haynes RB, Taylor DW, Sackett DL. Compliance in Health Care. Baltimore: Johns Hopkins University Press, 1979. ISBN 0-8018-2162-2.
- Sackett DL (1979). "Bias in analytic research". J Chronic Dis. 32 (1–2): 51–63. doi:10.1016/0021-9681(79)90012-2. PMID 447779.
- "Clinical disagreement I: how often it occurs, and why". Can Med Assoc J. 23 (499): 504. 1980.
- "Clinical disagreement II: how to avoid it and learn from one's mistakes". Can Med Assoc J. 123 (613): 617. 1980.
- "How to read clinical journals: I. Why to read them and how to start reading them critically". Can Med Assoc J. 124 (555): 558. 1981.
- Laupacis A, Sackett DL, Roberts RS (June 1988). "An assessment of clinically useful measures of the consequences of treatment". N. Engl. J. Med. 318 (26): 1728–33. doi:10.1056/NEJM198806303182605. PMID 3374545.
- Sackett DL (February 1986). "Rules of evidence and clinical recommendations on the use of antithrombotic agents". Chest. 89 (2): 2S–3S. doi:10.1378/chest.89.2_supplement.2s. PMID 3943408.
- Sackett DL, Haynes RB, Tugwell P. Clinical epidemiology: a basic science for clinical medicine, First edition. Boston: Little, Brown, 1985. ISBN 0-316-76595-3.
- North American Symptomatic Carotid Endarterectomy Trial Collaborators; Barnett HJM; Taylor, D. W.; Haynes, R. B.; Sackett, D. L.; Peerless, S. J.; Ferguson, G. G.; Fox, A. J.; Rankin, R. N.; Hachinski, V. C.; Wiebers, D. O.; Eliasziw, M. (1991). "Beneficial effect of carotid endarterectomy in symptomatic patients with high grade carotid stenosis". N Engl J Med. 325 (7): 445–53. doi:10.1056/nejm199108153250701. PMID 1852179.
- Guyatt GH, Sackett DL, Cook DJ (December 1993). "Users' guides to the medical literature. II. How to use an article about therapy or prevention. A. Are the results of the study valid? Evidence-Based Medicine Working Group". JAMA. 270 (21): 2598–601. doi:10.1001/jama.1993.03510210084032. PMID 8230645.
- Guyatt GH, Sackett DL, Cook DJ (January 1994). "Users' guides to the medical literature. II. How to use an article about therapy or prevention. B. What were the results and will they help me in caring for my patients? Evidence-Based Medicine Working Group". JAMA. 271 (1): 59–63. doi:10.1001/jama.271.1.59. PMID 8258890.
- Jaeschke R, Guyatt G, Sackett DL (February 1994). "Users' guides to the medical literature. III. How to use an article about a diagnostic test. A. Are the results of the study valid? Evidence-Based Medicine Working Group". JAMA. 271 (5): 389–91. doi:10.1001/jama.1994.03510290071040. PMID 8283589.
- Jaeschke R, Guyatt GH, Sackett DL (March 1994). "Users' guides to the medical literature. III. How to use an article about a diagnostic test. B. What are the results and will they help me in caring for my patients? The Evidence-Based Medicine Working Group". JAMA. 271 (9): 703–7. doi:10.1001/jama.271.9.703. PMID 8309035.
- Cook RJ, Sackett DL (February 1995). "The number needed to treat: a clinically useful measure of treatment effect". BMJ. 310 (6977): 452–4. doi:10.1136/bmj.310.6977.452. PMC 2548824. PMID 7873954.
- Sackett DL, Rosenberg WM, Gray JA, Haynes RB, Richardson WS (January 1996). "Evidence based medicine: what it is and what it isn't". BMJ. 312 (7023): 71–2. doi:10.1136/bmj.312.7023.71. PMC 2349778. PMID 8555924.
- Barnett HJ, Taylor DW, Eliasziw M; et al. (November 1998). "Benefit of carotid endarterectomy in patients with symptomatic moderate or severe stenosis. North American Symptomatic Carotid Endarterectomy Trial Collaborators". N. Engl. J. Med. 339 (20): 1415–25. doi:10.1056/NEJM199811123392002. PMID 9811916.
- Sackett DL, Straus SE, Richardson WS, Rosenberg W, Haynes RB. Evidence-based medicine: how to practice and teach EBM, 2nd ed. Edinburgh & New York: Churchill Livingstone, 2000. ISBN 0-443-06240-4.
- Haynes RB, Sackett DL, Guyatt GH, Tugwell P. Clinical epidemiology: how to do clinical practice research, 3rd edition. Philadelphia: Lippincott, Williams and Wilkins, 2006. ISBN 0-7817-4524-1.
- Straus SE, Sackett DL, Mentorship in Academic Medicine. John Wiley & Sons, 2014. Print ISBN 9781118446027 doi:10.1002/9781118446065

== See also ==
- Gordon Guyatt
- David-Sackett-Preis
