= Carl R. May =

British sociologist (born 1961)

Carl May FAcSS (born 1961, in Farnham, Surrey) is a British sociologist. He researches in the fields of medical sociology and Implementation Science. Formerly based at Southampton University and Newcastle University, he is now Professor of Health Systems Implementation at the London School of Hygiene and Tropical Medicine. Carl May was elected an Academician of the Academy of Learned Societies in the Social Sciences in 2006. He was appointed a Senior Investigator at the National Institute for Health and Care Research (NIHR) in 2010. He was elected an Honorary Fellow of the Royal College of General Practitioners in 2020. He has honorary professorial appointments in primary care at the University of Melbourne, and in public health at Monash University.

May is best known for his contributions to Implementation Science and his work is represented by many studies of the interaction between health technologies and their users. In Implementation Science his work investigates how innovations become routinely embedded in health care and other organizational systems. This research has led to Normalization Process Theory, developed with Tracy Finch and others, including Victor Montori. This is a sociological theory of the implementation, embedding, and integration of new technologies and organizational innovations. May and colleagues have applied Normalization Process Theory to explaining patient non-compliance with treatment, proposing that a proportion of non-compliance is structurally induced by healthcare systems themselves as patients are overburdened by treatment. To counter this, they have proposed Minimally Disruptive Medicine, which seeks to take account of its effects on patients' workload.
