= Appointment to the Order of Canada =

Civilian honour induction process

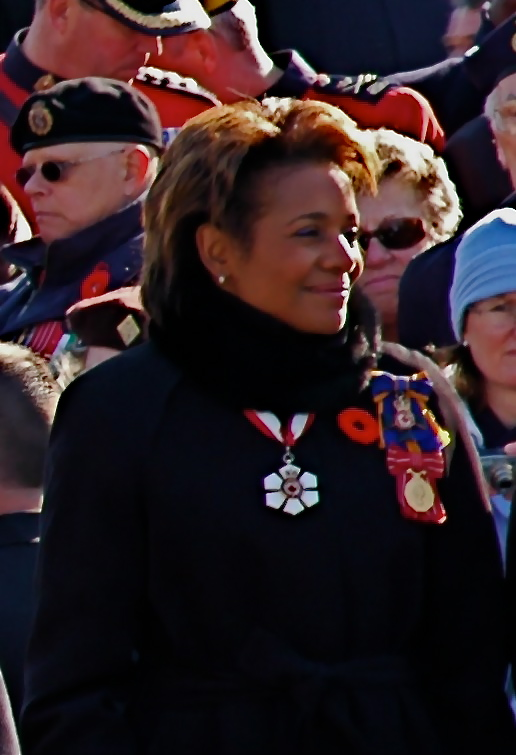
Governor General Michaëlle Jean wearing the Companion's insignia around her neck, Remembrance Day 2007

Appointment to the Order of Canada is the process by which citizens of Canada or certain foreign persons are inducted into the Order of Canada, the second-highest civilian honour within the Canadian system of honours. Any living Canadian or foreign national may be nominated for appointment; however, the advisory council of the Order of Canada and the Governor General of Canada make the final decision on appointments. Recipients of the order may also be promoted to a higher grade within it if they have continued to provide outstanding service to Canada, or to humanity in general, after their appointment.

== Eligibility ==
Paragraph nine of the Constitution of the Order of Canada lists the criteria for appointment to the order. All living Canadians are eligible for any of the three levels of the order, except federal and provincial politicians and judges while they are holding office. Multiple people who have committed the same honourable act or deed are also eligible for induction; for example, all three members of the band Rush (Geddy Lee, Alex Lifeson, and Neil Peart) have been appointed as Officers of the order, the first time a group, rather than an individual, was appointed to the Order of Canada. All three members of the children's group Sharon, Lois & Bram (Sharon Trostin Hampson, Lois Lilienstein, and Bramwell Morrison) have also been made members of the order – although, since Lilienstein is an American citizen, she was made an honorary member.

A new member whose appointment is approved during their lifetime but who dies prior to either the announcement of that appointment or their investiture, may be invested posthumously. The 2005 appointment of journalist Peter Jennings was announced under these circumstances; his daughter, Elizabeth Jennings, accepted the insignia on her father's behalf in October, 2006. The oldest person ever to be invested into the order was Cornelius Wiebe, who was 106 years old at the time of his investiture in 1999.

Commonly, influential political leaders, such as former prime ministers, are appointed after they retire from politics. John Diefenbaker was the only living former prime minister not to be appointed to the Order of Canada; after losing the prime ministership to Lester B. Pearson in 1963, Diefenbaker remained a sitting member of parliament and died while still in office in 1979, never becoming eligible. Others, such as former New Democratic Party leader Ed Broadbent and former Prime Minister Joe Clark, were appointed after exiting politics, only to later return to elected office. There have also been several senators who were appointed to the order prior to taking office; as of 2011 there were 15 senators who belonged to the order: Tommy Banks, Roméo Dallaire, Trevor Eyton, Irving Gerstein, Nancy Greene, Serge Joyal, Wilbert Keon, Jean Lapointe, Sandra Lovelace Nicholas, Frank Mahovlich, Donald Oliver, Kelvin Ogilvie, Nancy Ruth, Hugh Segal and Pamela Wallin. Further, in the same vein as prime ministers being appointed after leaving office, every chief justice of Canada from Robert Taschereau onward has been made a Companion. People who hold a ceremonial political office (for example sergeant-at-arms) are considered public servants and therefore can be invested while serving in that office. There is no rule that Order of Canada members cannot be inducted to any of the Canadian provincial or territorial orders. For example, Gordon Lightfoot was both a Companion of the Order of Canada and member of the Order of Ontario, and Oscar Peterson, who was born in Montreal but resided in Ontario during his later years, was simultaneously a Companion of the Order of Canada, Knight of the National Order of Quebec, and a member of the Order of Ontario.

Media magnate Conrad Black, Baron Black of Crossharbour, was the only non-honorary member of the Order of Canada who did not hold Canadian citizenship. Black was appointed as an Officer of the order in 1990, and surrendered his Canadian citizenship in 2001 to overcome political hurdles preventing his appointment to the House of Lords. Black was convicted of mail fraud in 2007. On January 31, 2014, he was removed from the Order of Canada by Gov. Gen. David Johnston.

== Nomination, review, and appointment ==
The Chancellery of Honours at Rideau Hall, which administers the Canadian honours system, permits anyone to submit nominations for the Order of Canada any time of the year. A form is completed – including notes on the candidate's life and accomplishments, the nominator's and the candidate's information (such as birth, citizenship, address, and occupation), and three supporters of the nomination – and sent to the Chancellery. Once there, the letter is kept in a file unannounced, due to privacy of the nominee and the person who made the nomination.

=== Companion ===
To be considered for appointment for the rank of Companion, one must have made "outstanding achievement and merit of the highest degree, especially in service to Canada or to humanity at large." The order's constitution dictates that two people are automatically made Extraordinary Companions to the order: the Governor General, and his or her spouse.

The Governor General and his or her spouse will each continue to be Companions of the order until they are deceased. If the maximum number of 165 Companions has been reached, no more appointments can be made until a vacancy occurs, which can come due to death, resignation of the Companion, or the removal of the individual from the order. Each year up to 15 people can be either appointed to the grade directly or promoted from the grade of Officer to Companion; however, the four honorary Companions living today do not count towards the 165 total. The ex-officio Companions, which currently comprise Edward Schreyer, Lily Schreyer, Gerda Hnatyshyn, Diana Fowler LeBlanc, Adrienne Clarkson, John Ralston Saul, Michaëlle Jean, Jean-Daniel Lafond, David Johnston, Sharon Johnston, Julie Payette, Mary Simon and Whit Fraser, are not counted toward the maximum number of Companions. From 1997 until his appointment as Governor General in 2011 David Johnston held a substantive appointment as a Companion.

=== Officer ===
A person can be appointed to the rank of Officer for "achievement and merit of a high degree, especially service to Canada or to humanity at large." Unlike the rank of Companion, there is no limit on how many Officers can be living at one time, though the Governor General may only appoint up to sixty-four Officers per year, excluding honorary appointments. A person can become an Officer by being promoted from the grade of Member or being appointed directly to the rank.

=== Member ===
A person can be appointed to the rank of Member for "distinguished service in or to a particular community, group or field of activity." There is no limit to how many Members can be living at one time, though the Governor General may only appoint up to 136 Members per year.

=== Honorary ===
A non-Canadian can be considered for membership in all three grades; however, the Governor General can only make five of these appointments per year. Honorary members are allowed to use post-nominal letters and wear the insignia in public.

=== Appointment ===
Once the nomination has been received by the Chancellery of Honours, it will be evaluated by the Advisory Council of the Order of Canada. The members of the Council evaluate and vote on each nomination at their meetings. At the end of each meeting, their recommendations will be sent to the Governor General. The Governor General will follow the recommendations and will sign an Instrument appointing the members to the Order.

The names of inductees into the Order of Canada are announced twice annually, once around New Year's Day (January 1) and again around Canada Day (July 1).

== Investiture ==
Induction ceremonies are generally conducted by the Governor General at Rideau Hall in Ottawa or, on rare occasions, by the Queen herself; Elizabeth II performed her first Order of Canada investiture at Rideau Hall in August, 1973. The 2002 ceremony was held at Halifax's Pier 21 to mark the 50th anniversary of Canadian Governors General, but the most common reason for the insignia not being presented at Rideau Hall is the recipient's inability to travel to Ottawa. An early example of this occurred in 1980 when activist athlete Terry Fox was dying of terminal cancer. A more recent example occurred in 2003 with singer-songwriter Gordon Lightfoot: in 2002, shortly before a concert, Lightfoot suffered a serious abdominal hemorrhage that resulted in his being in a coma for a time and months in hospital recovering. On the news of his near-death condition, Lightfoot was promoted to the rank of Companion. Since his condition left him unable to travel, Adrienne Clarkson flew to Toronto and presented him with the insignia in a private ceremony performed in his hospital room. Similarly, in 2000 Queen Elizabeth, the Queen Mother, at the age of 100, was invested as an Honorary Companion at Clarence House in London. Rather than place the insignia on the Queen Mother, who was recovering from a hip replacement, Clarkson handed Her Majesty her badge. Her Majesty made a point of wearing it around her neck at a special lunch following the private ceremony. Inductions can also be delegated to another individual, such as a Lieutenant Governor, as was the case when Mervyn Wilkinson was inducted into the order by Iona Campagnolo, the then Lieutenant Governor of British Columbia, in 2002. Investitures can also be delayed, such as in the case of Wayne Gretzky, who was appointed to the grade of Officer in 1984 for his outstanding contributions to the game of ice hockey. However, as the ceremonies always conflicted with his hockey schedule, it was not until over 13 years, and two governors general, later that Gretzky could personally be invested into the order. The longest delay between appointment and investiture was the 23-year delay of W. Bruce Hutchison. Hutchison was appointed in July 1967, but did not attend the investiture ceremony until April 1990.

Prior to Clarkson becoming Governor General of Canada, Order of Canada inductions were rarely performed outside of Rideau Hall or the Governor General's secondary residence La Citadelle. Under her tenure Clarkson held entire investment ceremonies in cities like St. John's, Newfoundland and Labrador, and Vancouver, British Columbia. She was also noted for delegating the duty to other individuals on certain occasions when it would have been difficult for her or the recipient to travel.

== Role of politicians in appointment ==
Prior to the 1970s honorary appointments to the order had to be approved by Cabinet. This bureaucratic hurdle resulted in there being no honorary appointments to the order until the 1980s. In 1972 John Grierson was expected to be authorized as the first honorary companion by Cabinet, and notice of his appointment was prepared in advance of cabinet rubber stamping the nomination. However, Grierson died one day before his appointment could be finalized. This incident was a driving force in devolving this procedure from the entire cabinet, to the minister of foreign affairs.

The appointment process for the Order of Canada is notable for being mostly removed from the active partisan influence normally seen in the British honours system. Unlike in many nations, active federal and provincial politicians cannot be admitted into the order until they exit elected office. Nevertheless, there have been some occasions where the House of Commons has felt it necessary to interfere. The most notable (and perhaps most successful) was Zena Sheardown, the first honorary appointment to the Order. Sheardown sheltered four American diplomats in her house for months during the Canadian Caper. While others involved in the scheme were admitted into the order, Sheardown was not. Her appointment was delayed because she was not a Canadian citizen. Flora MacDonald had to ask for, and receive authorization from the House of Commons that Sheardown deserved membership in the order before her appointment was seriously considered.

It is also notable that occasionally sitting members of the House of Commons rise to offer congratulations to people in their districts who have been admitted into the order. Some speakers of the House have discouraged this practice because it blurs the line between partisan politics and the apolitical nature of the order.

On rare occasions, some sitting politicians have been known to comment on controversial appointments to the Order of Canada. When Dr. Henry Morgentaler was appointed a member of the Order of Canada, Maurice Vellacott, a Conservative member of Parliament known for his pro-life views, told The Globe and Mail, "There are so many deserving Canadians, there was no need to choose somebody like Dr. Morgentaler."

The New Democratic Party called for the Governor-General to remove Conrad Black from the Order following his conviction for obstruction of justice.
