= Evidence-based medicine =

Illness diagnosis, treatment and prevention based on data collection and analysis

Evidence-based medicine (EBM), sometimes known within healthcare as evidence-based practice (EBP), is "the conscientious, explicit and judicious use of current best evidence in making decisions about the care of individual patients. It means integrating individual clinical expertise with the best available external clinical evidence from systematic research." The aim of EBM is to integrate the experience of the clinician, the values of the patient, and the best available scientific information to guide decision-making about clinical management. The term was originally used to describe an approach to teaching the practice of medicine and improving decisions by individual physicians about individual patients.

The EBM Pyramid is a tool that helps in visualizing the hierarchy of evidence in medicine, from least authoritative, like expert opinions, to most authoritative, like systematic reviews.

Adoption of evidence-based medicine is necessary in a human rights-based approach to public health and a precondition for accessing the right to health.

== Background, history, and definition ==
Medicine has a long history of scientific inquiry into the prevention, diagnosis, and treatment of human disease. In the 11th century AD, Avicenna, a Persian physician and philosopher, developed an approach to EBM that was mostly similar to current ideas and practises.

The concept of a controlled clinical trial was first described in 1662 by Jan Baptist van Helmont in reference to the practice of bloodletting. Wrote Van Helmont:

Let us take out of the Hospitals, out of the Camps, or from elsewhere, 200, or 500 poor People, that have fevers or Pleuritis. Let us divide them in Halfes, let us cast lots, that one halfe of them may fall to my share, and the others to yours; I will cure them without blood-letting and sensible evacuation; but you do, as ye know ... we shall see how many Funerals both of us shall have...

The first published report describing the conduct and results of a controlled clinical trial was by James Lind, a Scottish naval surgeon who conducted research on scurvy during his time aboard HMS Salisbury in the Channel Fleet, while patrolling the Bay of Biscay. Lind divided the sailors participating in his experiment into six groups, so that the effects of various treatments could be fairly compared. Lind found improvement in symptoms and signs of scurvy among the group of men treated with lemons or oranges. He published a treatise describing the results of this experiment in 1753.

An early critique of statistical methods in medicine was published in 1835, in Comtes Rendus de l'Académie des Sciences, Paris, by a man referred to as "Mr Civiale".

In 1990, Gordon Guyatt, then a young internal medicine residency coordinator at McMaster University, introduced a teaching method he initially termed "Scientific Medicine." This approach emphasized applying critical appraisal techniques directly to bedside clinical decision-making, building on the work of his mentor, David Sackett. However, the concept met resistance from colleagues, as it implied that existing clinical practices lacked scientific rigor, even though this was likely true. To address this, Guyatt rebranded the approach as "Evidence-Based Medicine", a term first formally introduced in a 1991 editorial in the ACP Journal Club. Although the name was coined in 1991, it took several years after and a concerted efforts of many other teams to define the foundations of this method.

Although more popular in medicine, the concept of "evidence-based" is spreading to other disciplines, such as the humanities, and to languages other than English, albeit at a slower pace.

=== Clinical decision-making ===
Alvan Feinstein's publication of Clinical Judgment in 1967 focused attention on the role of clinical reasoning and identified biases that can affect it. In 1972, Archie Cochrane published Effectiveness and Efficiency, which described the lack of controlled trials supporting many practices that had previously been assumed to be effective. In 1973, John Wennberg began to document wide variations in how physicians practiced. Through the 1980s, David M. Eddy described errors in clinical reasoning and gaps in evidence. In the mid-1980s, Alvin Feinstein, David Sackett and others published textbooks on clinical epidemiology, which translated epidemiological methods to physician decision-making. Toward the end of the 1980s, a group at RAND showed that large proportions of procedures performed by physicians were considered inappropriate even by the standards of their own experts.

=== Evidence-based guidelines and policies ===
David M. Eddy first began to use the term 'evidence-based' in 1987 in workshops and a manual commissioned by the Council of Medical Specialty Societies to teach formal methods for designing clinical practice guidelines. The manual was eventually published by the American College of Physicians. Eddy first published the term 'evidence-based' in March 1990, in an article in the Journal of the American Medical Association (JAMA) that laid out the principles of evidence-based guidelines and population-level policies, which Eddy described as "explicitly describing the available evidence that pertains to a policy and tying the policy to evidence instead of standard-of-care practices or the beliefs of experts. The pertinent evidence must be identified, described, and analyzed. The policymakers must determine whether the policy is justified by the evidence. A rationale must be written." He discussed evidence-based policies in several other papers published in JAMA in the spring of 1990. Those papers were part of a series of 28 published in JAMA between 1990 and 1997 on formal methods for designing population-level guidelines and policies.

=== Medical education ===
The term 'evidence-based medicine' was introduced slightly later, in the context of medical education. In the autumn of 1990, Gordon Guyatt used it in an unpublished description of a program at McMaster University for prospective or new medical students. Guyatt and others first published the term two years later (1992) to describe a new approach to teaching the practice of medicine.

In 1996, David Sackett and colleagues clarified the definition of this tributary of evidence-based medicine as "the conscientious, explicit and judicious use of current best evidence in making decisions about the care of individual patients. ... [It] means integrating individual clinical expertise with the best available external clinical evidence from systematic research." This branch of evidence-based medicine aims to make individual decision making more structured and objective by better reflecting the evidence from research. Population-based data are applied to the care of an individual patient, while respecting the fact that practitioners have clinical expertise reflected in effective and efficient diagnosis and thoughtful identification and compassionate use of individual patients' predicaments, rights, and preferences.

Between 1993 and 2000, the Evidence-Based Medicine Working Group at McMaster University published the methods to a broad physician audience in a series of 25 "Users' Guides to the Medical Literature" in JAMA. In 1995 Rosenberg and Donald defined individual-level, evidence-based medicine as "the process of finding, appraising, and using contemporaneous research findings as the basis for medical decisions." In 2010, Greenhalgh used a definition that emphasized quantitative methods: "the use of mathematical estimates of the risk of benefit and harm, derived from high-quality research on population samples, to inform clinical decision-making in the diagnosis, investigation or management of individual patients."

The two original definitions highlight important differences in how evidence-based medicine is applied to populations versus individuals. When designing guidelines applied to large groups of people in settings with relatively little opportunity for modification by individual physicians, evidence-based policymaking emphasizes that good evidence should exist to document a test's or treatment's effectiveness. In the setting of individual decision-making, practitioners can be given greater latitude in how they interpret research and combine it with their clinical judgment. In 2005, Eddy offered an umbrella definition for the two branches of EBM: "Evidence-based medicine is a set of principles and methods intended to ensure that to the greatest extent possible, medical decisions, guidelines, and other types of policies are based on and consistent with good evidence of effectiveness and benefit."

=== Progress ===
In the area of evidence-based guidelines and policies, the explicit insistence on evidence of effectiveness was introduced by the American Cancer Society in 1980. The U.S. Preventive Services Task Force (USPSTF) began issuing guidelines for preventive interventions based on evidence-based principles in 1984. In 1985, the Blue Cross Blue Shield Association applied strict evidence-based criteria for covering new technologies. Beginning in 1987, specialty societies such as the American College of Physicians, and voluntary health organizations such as the American Heart Association, wrote many evidence-based guidelines. In 1991, Kaiser Permanente, a managed care organization in the US, began an evidence-based guidelines program. In 1991, Richard Smith wrote an editorial in the British Medical Journal and introduced the ideas of evidence-based policies in the UK. In 1993, the Cochrane Collaboration created a network of 13 countries to produce systematic reviews and guidelines. In 1997, the US Agency for Healthcare Research and Quality (AHRQ, then known as the Agency for Health Care Policy and Research, or AHCPR) established Evidence-based Practice Centers (EPCs) to produce evidence reports and technology assessments to support the development of guidelines. In the same year, a National Guideline Clearinghouse that followed the principles of evidence-based policies was created by AHRQ, the AMA, and the American Association of Health Plans (now America's Health Insurance Plans). In 1999, the National Institute for Clinical Excellence (NICE) was created in the UK to circulate evidence and guidance on treatments within the NHS.

In the area of medical education, medical schools in Canada, the US, the UK, Australia, and other countries now offer programs that teach evidence-based medicine. A 2009 study of UK programs found that more than half of UK medical schools offered some training in evidence-based medicine, although the methods and content varied considerably, and EBM teaching was restricted by lack of curriculum time, trained tutors and teaching materials. Many programs have been developed to help individual physicians gain better access to evidence. For example, UpToDate was created in the early 1990s. The Cochrane Collaboration began publishing evidence reviews in 1993. In 1995, BMJ Publishing Group launched Clinical Evidence, a 6-monthly periodical that provided brief summaries of the current state of evidence about important clinical questions for clinicians.

=== Current practice ===
By 2000, use of the term evidence-based had extended to other levels of the health care system. An example is evidence-based health services, which seek to increase the competence of health service decision makers and the practice of evidence-based medicine at the organizational or institutional level.

The multiple tributaries of evidence-based medicine share an emphasis on the importance of incorporating evidence from formal research in medical policies and decisions. However, because they differ on the extent to which they require good evidence of effectiveness before promoting a guideline or payment policy, a distinction is sometimes made between evidence-based medicine and science-based medicine, which also takes into account factors such as prior plausibility and compatibility with established science (as when medical organizations promote controversial treatments such as acupuncture). Differences also exist regarding the extent to which it is feasible to incorporate individual-level information in decisions. Thus, evidence-based guidelines and policies may not readily "hybridise" with experience-based practices orientated towards ethical clinical judgement, and can lead to contradictions, contest, and unintended crises. The most effective "knowledge leaders" (managers and clinical leaders) use a broad range of management knowledge in their decision making, rather than just formal evidence. Evidence-based guidelines may provide the basis for governmentality in health care, and consequently play a central role in the governance of contemporary health care systems.

== Methods ==
=== Steps ===
The steps for designing explicit, evidence-based guidelines were described in the late 1980s: formulate the question (population, intervention, comparison intervention, outcomes, time horizon, setting); search the literature to identify studies that inform the question; interpret each study to determine precisely what it says about the question; if several studies address the question, synthesize their results (meta-analysis); summarize the evidence in evidence tables; compare the benefits, harms and costs in a balance sheet; draw a conclusion about the preferred practice; write the guideline; write the rationale for the guideline; have others review each of the previous steps; implement the guideline.

For the purposes of medical education and individual-level decision making, five steps of EBM in practice were described in 1992 and the experience of delegates attending the 2003 Conference of Evidence-Based Health Care Teachers and Developers was summarized into five steps and published in 2005. This five-step process can broadly be categorized as follows:

1. Translation of uncertainty to an answerable question; includes critical questioning, study design and levels of evidence
2. Systematic retrieval of the best evidence available
3. Critical appraisal of evidence for internal validity that can be broken down into aspects regarding:
  - Systematic errors as a result of selection bias, information bias and confounding
  - Quantitative aspects of diagnosis and treatment
  - The effect size and aspects regarding its precision
  - Clinical importance of results
  - External validity or generalizability
4. Application of results in practice
5. Evaluation of performance

=== Evidence reviews ===
Systematic reviews of published research studies are a major part of the evaluation of particular treatments. The Cochrane Collaboration is one of the best-known organisations that conducts systematic reviews. Like other producers of systematic reviews, it requires authors to provide a detailed study protocol as well as a reproducible plan of their literature search and evaluations of the evidence. After the best evidence is assessed, treatment is categorized as (1) likely to be beneficial, (2) likely to be harmful, or (3) without evidence to support either benefit or harm.

A 2007 analysis of 1,016 systematic reviews from all 50 Cochrane Collaboration Review Groups found that 44% of the reviews concluded that the intervention was likely to be beneficial, 7% concluded that the intervention was likely to be harmful, and 49% concluded that evidence did not support either benefit or harm. 96% recommended further research. In 2017, a study assessed the role of systematic reviews produced by Cochrane Collaboration to inform US private payers' policymaking; it showed that although the medical policy documents of major US private payers were informed by Cochrane systematic reviews, there was still scope to encourage the further use.

=== Assessing the quality of evidence ===
Evidence-based medicine categorizes different types of clinical evidence and rates or grades them according to the strength of their freedom from the various biases that beset medical research. For example, the strongest evidence for therapeutic interventions is provided by systematic review of randomized, well-blinded, placebo-controlled trials with allocation concealment and complete follow-up involving a homogeneous patient population and medical condition. In contrast, patient testimonials, case reports, and even expert opinion have little value as proof because of the placebo effect, the biases inherent in observation and reporting of cases, and difficulties in ascertaining who is an expert (however, some critics have argued that expert opinion "does not belong in the rankings of the quality of empirical evidence because it does not represent a form of empirical evidence" and continue that "expert opinion would seem to be a separate, complex type of knowledge that would not fit into hierarchies otherwise limited to empirical evidence alone.").

Several organizations have developed grading systems for assessing the quality of evidence. For example, in 1989 the U.S. Preventive Services Task Force (USPSTF) put forth the following system:

- Level I: Evidence obtained from at least one properly designed randomized controlled trial.
- Level II-1: Evidence obtained from well-designed controlled trials without randomization.
- Level II-2: Evidence obtained from well-designed cohort studies or case-control studies, preferably from more than one center or research group.
- Level II-3: Evidence obtained from multiple time series designs with or without the intervention. Dramatic results in uncontrolled trials might also be regarded as this type of evidence.
- Level III: Opinions of respected authorities, based on clinical experience, descriptive studies, or reports of expert committees.

Another example are the Oxford CEBM Levels of Evidence published by the Centre for Evidence-Based Medicine. First released in September 2000, the Levels of Evidence provide a way to rank evidence for claims about prognosis, diagnosis, treatment benefits, treatment harms, and screening, which most grading schemes do not address. The original CEBM Levels were Evidence-Based On Call to make the process of finding evidence feasible and its results explicit. In 2011, an international team redesigned the Oxford CEBM Levels to make them more understandable and to take into account recent developments in evidence ranking schemes. The Oxford CEBM Levels of Evidence have been used by patients and clinicians, as well as by experts to develop clinical guidelines, such as recommendations for the optimal use of phototherapy and topical therapy in psoriasis and guidelines for the use of the BCLC staging system for diagnosing and monitoring hepatocellular carcinoma in Canada.

In 2000, a system was developed by the Grading of Recommendations Assessment, Development and Evaluation (GRADE) working group. The GRADE system takes into account more dimensions than just the quality of medical research. It requires users who are performing an assessment of the quality of evidence, usually as part of a systematic review, to consider the impact of different factors on their confidence in the results. Authors of GRADE tables assign one of four levels to evaluate the quality of evidence, on the basis of their confidence that the observed effect (a numeric value) is close to the true effect. The confidence value is based on judgments assigned in five different domains in a structured manner. The GRADE working group defines 'quality of evidence' and 'strength of recommendations' based on the quality as two different concepts that are commonly confused with each other.

Systematic reviews may include randomized controlled trials that have low risk of bias, or observational studies that have high risk of bias. In the case of randomized controlled trials, the quality of evidence is high but can be downgraded in five different domains.

- Risk of bias: A judgment made on the basis of the chance that bias in included studies has influenced the estimate of effect.
- Imprecision: A judgment made on the basis of the chance that the observed estimate of effect could change completely.
- Indirectness: A judgment made on the basis of the differences in characteristics of how the study was conducted and how the results are actually going to be applied.
- Inconsistency: A judgment made on the basis of the variability of results across the included studies.
- Publication bias: A judgment made on the basis of the question whether all the research evidence has been taken to account.

In the case of observational studies per GRADE, the quality of evidence starts off lower and may be upgraded in three domains in addition to being subject to downgrading.

- Large effect: Methodologically strong studies show that the observed effect is so large that the probability of it changing completely is less likely.
- Plausible confounding would change the effect: Despite the presence of a possible confounding factor that is expected to reduce the observed effect, the effect estimate still shows significant effect.
- Dose response gradient: The intervention used becomes more effective with increasing dose. This suggests that a further increase will likely bring about more effect.

Meaning of the levels of quality of evidence as per GRADE:

- High Quality Evidence: The authors are very confident that the presented estimate lies very close to the true value. In other words, the probability is very low that further research will completely change the presented conclusions.
- Moderate Quality Evidence: The authors are confident that the presented estimate lies close to the true value, but it is also possible that it may be substantially different. In other words, further research may completely change the conclusions.
- Low Quality Evidence: The authors are not confident in the effect estimate, and the true value may be substantially different. In other words, further research is likely to change the presented conclusions completely.
- Very Low Quality Evidence: The authors do not have any confidence in the estimate and it is likely that the true value is substantially different from it. In other words, new research will probably change the presented conclusions completely.

=== Categories of recommendations ===
In guidelines and other publications, recommendation for a clinical service is classified by the balance of risk versus benefit and the level of evidence on which this information is based. The U.S. Preventive Services Task Force uses the following system:

- Level A: Good scientific evidence suggests that the benefits of the clinical service substantially outweigh the potential risks. Clinicians should discuss the service with eligible patients.
- Level B: At least fair scientific evidence suggests that the benefits of the clinical service outweighs the potential risks. Clinicians should discuss the service with eligible patients.
- Level C: At least fair scientific evidence suggests that the clinical service provides benefits, but the balance between benefits and risks is too close for general recommendations. Clinicians need not offer it unless individual considerations apply.
- Level D: At least fair scientific evidence suggests that the risks of the clinical service outweigh potential benefits. Clinicians should not routinely offer the service to asymptomatic patients.
- Level I: Scientific evidence is lacking, of poor quality, or conflicting, such that the risk versus benefit balance cannot be assessed. Clinicians should help patients understand the uncertainty surrounding the clinical service.

GRADE guideline panelists may make strong or weak recommendations on the basis of further criteria. Some of the important criteria are the balance between desirable and undesirable effects (not considering cost), the quality of the evidence, values and preferences and costs (resource utilization).

Despite the differences between systems, the purposes are the same: to guide users of clinical research information on which studies are likely to be most valid. However, the individual studies still require careful critical appraisal

=== Statistical measures ===
Evidence-based medicine attempts to express clinical benefits of tests and treatments using mathematical methods. Tools used by practitioners of evidence-based medicine include:

- Likelihood ratio The pre-test odds of a particular diagnosis, multiplied by the likelihood ratio, determines the post-test odds. (Odds can be calculated from, and then converted to, the [more familiar] probability.) This reflects Bayes' theorem. The differences in likelihood ratio between clinical tests can be used to prioritize clinical tests according to their usefulness in a given clinical situation.
- AUC-ROC The area under the receiver operating characteristic curve (AUC-ROC) reflects the relationship between sensitivity and specificity for a given test. High-quality tests will have an AUC-ROC approaching 1, and high-quality publications about clinical tests will provide information about the AUC-ROC. Cutoff values for positive and negative tests can influence specificity and sensitivity, but they do not affect AUC-ROC.
- Number needed to treat (NNT)/Number needed to harm (NNH). NNT and NNH are ways of expressing the effectiveness and safety, respectively, of interventions in a way that is clinically meaningful. NNT is the number of people who need to be treated in order to achieve the desired outcome (e.g. survival from cancer) in one patient. For example, if a treatment increases the chance of survival by 5%, then 20 people need to be treated in order for 1 additional patient to survive because of the treatment. The concept can also be applied to diagnostic tests. For example, if 1,339 women age 50–59 need to be invited for breast cancer screening over a ten-year period in order to prevent one woman from dying of breast cancer, then the NNT for being invited to breast cancer screening is 1339.

=== Quality of clinical trials ===
Evidence-based medicine attempts to objectively evaluate the quality of clinical research by critically assessing techniques reported by researchers in their publications.

- Trial design considerations: High-quality studies have clearly defined eligibility criteria and have minimal missing data.
- Generalizability considerations: Studies may only be applicable to narrowly defined patient populations and may not be generalizable to other clinical contexts.
- Follow-up: Sufficient time for defined outcomes to occur can influence the prospective study outcomes and the statistical power of a study to detect differences between a treatment and control arm.
- Power: A mathematical calculation can determine whether the number of patients is sufficient to detect a difference between treatment arms. A negative study may reflect a lack of benefit, or simply a lack of sufficient quantities of patients to detect a difference.

== Limitations and criticism ==
There are a number of limitations and criticisms of evidence-based medicine. Two widely cited categorization schemes for the various published critiques of EBM include the three-fold division of Straus and McAlister ("limitations universal to the practice of medicine, limitations unique to evidence-based medicine and misperceptions of evidence-based-medicine") and the five-point categorization of Cohen, Stavri and Hersh (EBM is a poor philosophic basis for medicine, defines evidence too narrowly, is not evidence-based, is limited in usefulness when applied to individual patients, or reduces the autonomy of the doctor/patient relationship).

In no particular order, some published objections include:

- Research produced by EBM, such as from randomized controlled trials (RCTs), may not be relevant for all treatment situations. Research tends to focus on specific populations, but individual persons can vary substantially from population norms. Because certain population segments have been historically under-researched (due to reasons such as race, gender, age, and co-morbid diseases), evidence from RCTs may not be generalizable to those populations. Thus, EBM applies to groups of people, but this should not preclude clinicians from using their personal experience in deciding how to treat each patient. One author advises that "the knowledge gained from clinical research does not directly answer the primary clinical question of what is best for the patient at hand" and suggests that evidence-based medicine should not discount the value of clinical experience. Another author stated that "the practice of evidence-based medicine means integrating individual clinical expertise with the best available external clinical evidence from systematic research."
- Use of evidence-based guidelines often fits poorly for complex, multimorbid patients. This is because the guidelines are usually based on clinical studies focused on single diseases. In reality, the recommended treatments in such circumstances may interact unfavorably with each other and often lead to polypharmacy.
- The theoretical ideal of EBM (that every narrow clinical question, of which hundreds of thousands can exist, would be answered by meta-analysis and systematic reviews of multiple RCTs) faces the limitation that research (especially the RCTs themselves) is expensive; thus, in reality, for the foreseeable future, the demand for EBM will always be much higher than the supply, and the best humanity can do is to triage the application of scarce resources.
- Research can be influenced by biases such as political or belief bias, publication bias and conflict of interest in academic publishing. For example, studies with conflicts due to industry funding are more likely to favor their product. It has been argued that contemporary evidence based medicine is an illusion, since evidence based medicine has been corrupted by corporate interests, failed regulation, and commercialisation of academia.
- Systematic Reviews methodologies are capable of bias and abuse in respect of (i) choice of inclusion criteria (ii) choice of outcome measures, comparisons and analyses (iii) the subjectivity inevitable in Risk of Bias assessments, even when codified procedures and criteria are observed. An example of all these problems can be seen in a Cochrane Review.
- A lag exists between when the RCT is conducted and when its results are published.
- A lag exists between when results are published and when they are properly applied.
- Hypocognition (the absence of a simple, consolidated mental framework into which new information can be placed) can hinder the application of EBM.
- Values: while patient values are considered in the original definition of EBM, the importance of values is not commonly emphasized in EBM training, a potential problem under current study.

A 2018 study, "Why all randomised controlled trials produce biased results", assessed the 10 most cited RCTs and argued that trials face a wide range of biases and constraints, from trials only being able to study a small set of questions amenable to randomisation and generally only being able to assess the average treatment effect of a sample, to limitations in extrapolating results to another context, among many others outlined in the study.

== Application of evidence in clinical settings ==
Despite the emphasis on evidence-based medicine, unsafe or ineffective medical practices may occur. Contributing factors include clinicians not keeping up with or acting on current evidence, the rapid pace of scientific change, financial incentives, and patient demand for tests or treatments. Even when the evidence unequivocally shows that a treatment is either not safe or ineffective, it may take many years for other treatments to be adopted.

Several factors may contribute to lack of uptake or implementation of evidence-based recommendations. These include lack of awareness at the individual clinician or patient (micro) level, lack of institutional support at the organisation (meso) level or higher at the policy (macro) level. In other cases, significant change may require a generation of physicians to be replaced another trained with more recent evidence.

Revision of clinical guidelines to include an implementation plan may facilitate the uptake of new procedures, including analysis of the context, identifying barriers and facilitators, and designing strategies to address them.

== Education ==
Training in evidence based medicine is offered across the continuum of medical education. Educational competencies have been created for the education of health care professionals.

The Berlin questionnaire and the Fresno Test are validated instruments for assessing the effectiveness of education in evidence-based medicine. These questionnaires have been used in diverse settings.

A Campbell systematic review that included 24 trials examined the effectiveness of e-learning in improving evidence-based health care knowledge and practice. It was found that e-learning, compared to no learning, improves evidence-based health care knowledge and skills but not attitudes and behaviour. No difference in outcomes is present when comparing e-learning with face-to-face learning. Combining e-learning and face-to-face learning (blended learning) has a positive impact on evidence-based knowledge, skills, attitude and behavior. As a form of e-learning, some medical school students engage in editing Wikipedia to increase their EBM skills, and some students construct EBM materials to develop their skills in communicating medical knowledge.

== See also ==
- Anecdotal evidence
- Clinical decision support system (CDSS)
- Clinical epidemiology
- Consensus (medical)
- Epidemiology
- Evidence-based dentistry
- Evidence-based design
- Evidence-based nursing
- Evidence-based policy
- Evidence-based practices
- Evidence-based management
- Evidence-based research (Metascience)
- Hierarchy of evidence
- Medical algorithm
- Paradigm shift – the social process by which scientific evidence is eventually adopted
- Personalized medicine
- Policy-based evidence making
- Precision medicine
- Scientific evidence

== Bibliography ==
- Doi SA (2012). Understanding evidence in health care: Using clinical epidemiology. South Yarra, VIC, Australia: Palgrave Macmillan. ISBN 978-1-4202-5669-7.
- Grobbee DE, Hoes AW (2009). Clinical Epidemiology: Principles, Methods, and Applications for Clinical Research. Jones & Bartlett Learning. ISBN 978-0-7637-5315-3.
- Howick JH (2011). The Philosophy of Evidence-based Medicine. Wiley. ISBN 978-1-4051-9667-3.
- Katz DL (2001). Clinical Epidemiology & Evidence-Based Medicine: Fundamental Principles of Clinical Reasoning & Research. Sage. ISBN 978-0-7619-1939-1.
- Stegenga J (2018). Care and Cure: An Introduction To Philosophy of Medicine. University of Chicago Press. ISBN 978-0-226-59517-7.
