= Cold start =

Cold start can refer to:

- Cold start (automotive), the starting of a vehicle engine at a low temperature relative to its operating temperature.
- Cold start (computing), a startup problem in computer information systems.
- Cold Start (military doctrine), a military doctrine developed by the Indian Armed Forces.
- Cold start (recommender systems), the problem of recommending items to users with insufficient data
- "Cold Start" (Pole to Pole with Michael Palin), a 1992 television episode

== See also ==
- Cold open, a narrative technique used in television and films
