= Taw9eel =

Tawseel General Tranding, W.L.L.
- Company type: Private
- Website type: E-commerce
- Available in: English & Arabic
- Founded: 2006
- Headquarters: Kuwait.
- Area served: GCC
- Industry: Online shopping
- Website: taw9eel.com
- Advertising: Web banners Videos; Newspaperss
- Launched: 2006

Taw9eel.com (Tawseel General Trading W.L.L.) is a Kuwait-based electronic commerce company which is the biggest online retailer in Kuwait. Taw9eel, is owned by Tawseel Holding Group which owns and operates multiple ecommerce website such as Sheeel.com, Thouqi.com and Berwaz.com. The company and main website name comes from the Arabic language, where the Arabic word Tawseel, (Arabic:توصيل) translates to the word delivery in the English language.

== History ==
Taw9eel.com went online in 2006. Sheeel.com sold its first deal on January 19, 2011.

== Awards ==
Tawseel won the Kuwait e-Awards in two consecutive years, 2010 and 2011. The Kuwait e-Awards is sponsored by the Kuwait Foundation for the Advancement of Sciences (KFAS), and is arranged in cooperation with the World Summit Award. In 2010, Tawseel won first place in the Kuwait e-Awards for Taw9eel.com. In 2011, Tawseel was again awarded first place in the Kuwait e-Awards under the e-commerce category for its website Sheeel.com, only three months after launch.

== Business ==
Tawseel sells similar product lines through two websites. Taw9eel.com uses as more traditional e-commerce website sales model while Sheeel.com uses a deal-of-the-day sales model. Tawseel product lines include groceries, consumer electronics, kitchen items, tools, toys & games, baby products, special apparel, sporting goods, health-care items, books, beauty products, and groceries. The website marketing efforts is focused on driving traffic using social media outlets such as Twitter and Facebook. Both Tawseel websites are viewable via a normal website using desktop browser and a Webapp using Smartphones.

== Geographic markets ==
Taw9eel.com serves customers only in the State of Kuwait.

Sheeel.com serves only in Kuwait.
