= Tuniscope =

- Website type: News
- Available in: French
- Website: tuniscope.com
- Commercial: Yes
- Registration: None
- Current status: Online

Tuniscope is a community web portal based in Tunis, focusing on the news and culture of Tunisia. The site is operated by the Tunisian company Eolia. The managing editor is Khaled Aouij; the editors are Amal Jerbi and Abir Fares.

According to Google Trends, in April 2011 the site had on average 10,000 daily unique visitors

In 2010, the site was awarded a WSA-mobile World Summit Award by the World Summit on the Information Society, for Outstanding Regional Achievement in Media and News.
