= Joseph A. Konstan =

American professor and computer scientist

- Citizenship: United States
- Education: Harvard University (A.B., 1987); University of California, Berkeley (M.S., 1990); University of California, Berkeley (Ph.D., 1993)
- Awards: IEEE Fellow (2013); ACM Fellow (2008)
- Scientific career
- Fields: Computer Science, Human-Computer Interaction
- Workplaces: University of Minnesota
- Thesis: An Event-Based Architecture for Graphical User Interface Toolkits (1993)
- Doctoral advisor: Lawrence A. Rowe

Joseph A. Konstan is an American computer scientist and professor at the University of Minnesota. His research focuses on human–computer interaction, recommender systems, social computing, personalization, and applications of computing to health and medicine. He is associated with the GroupLens Research group, which conducted early research on collaborative filtering and recommender systems.

Konstan is a Distinguished McKnight University Professor and Distinguished University Teaching Professor in the Department of Computer Science and Engineering at the University of Minnesota, where he also serves as Associate Dean for Research in the College of Science and Engineering.

== Early life and education ==
Konstan received an A.B. in computer science from Harvard University in 1987. He subsequently studied computer science at the University of California, Berkeley, receiving an M.S. in 1990 and a Ph.D. in 1993. His doctoral dissertation was titled An Event-Based Architecture for Graphical User-Interface Toolkits and was supervised by Lawrence A. Rowe.

== Academic career ==
Konstan joined the Department of Computer Science and Engineering at the University of Minnesota in 1992 as an assistant professor. He was promoted to associate professor with tenure in 1999 and to full professor in 2005. He became a Distinguished McKnight University Professor in 2009 and a Distinguished University Teaching Professor in 2010. From 2007 to 2017 he held a secondary appointment as Adjunct Professor of Epidemiology and Community Health in the University of Minnesota School of Public Health. He served as associate head of the department from 2008 to 2015 and became Associate Dean for Research in the College of Science and Engineering in 2019.

== Research ==
Konstan's research has focused primarily on human-computer interaction and the ways computer systems can support interaction, personalization, collaboration, and participation. A major part of his work has concerned recommender systems, particularly collaborative filtering, in which information about users and their interactions is used to generate personalized recommendations.

=== GroupLens and recommender systems ===
Konstan has been a member of the University of Minnesota's GroupLens research group since 1995. GroupLens conducted research into collaborative filtering and developed systems for recommending information to users based on patterns of user preferences and behavior. The group's early work included the GroupLens system for recommending Usenet news articles. Among Konstan's frequently cited publications is the 1997 Communications of the ACM paper "GroupLens: Applying Collaborative Filtering to Usenet News," coauthored with Bradley Miller, David Maltz, Jonathan Herlocker, Lee Gordon, and John Riedl. His later work examined the design and evaluation of collaborative filtering systems and their effects on user experience.

Konstan, John Riedl and their collaborators also developed MovieLens, a research system and dataset used in studies of recommender systems. The MovieLens datasets have subsequently been used extensively in recommender-system research. His 2004 paper with Jonathan Herlocker, Loren Terveen, and Riedl, "Evaluating Collaborative Filtering Recommender Systems," examined methods for evaluating recommendation systems and was published in ACM Transactions on Information Systems.

Konstan's subsequent research has considered recommender systems from the perspective of user experience rather than algorithms alone. In a review with Riedl, he examined how the integration of recommendation algorithms into user interfaces affects their usefulness and argued for evaluation methods that take broader aspects of user experience into account.

According to Google Scholar, seventeen of Konstan's publications have each been cited more than 1,000 times, including papers on collaborative filtering algorithms and recommender system evaluation.

=== Social computing, online communities and human-centered artificial intelligence ===
Another area of Konstan's research concerns social computing and online communities. His work has examined how computing systems can encourage participation, support collaboration, and facilitate interaction among users. His research group has also investigated methods for conducting experiments in online communities and understanding the effects of personalization and other computational interventions. In the 2020s, his work included research on the ethical dimensions of online community research and on systems for conducting experiments involving personalized news. A 2025 paper coauthored by Konstan examined community-level harms and benefits in online community research.

More recently, Konstan has been more active in exploring directions for human-centered artificial intelligence, including co-authoring a widely-cited article outlining six human-centered artificial intelligence grand challenges and editing a special issue of IJHCI on AI, decision-making, and the impact on humans.

=== Health applications ===
Konstan's research also applies his human-computer interaction expertise to problems in public health and medicine. From 2007 to 2017 he held a secondary appointment as Adjunct Professor of Epidemiology and Community Health at the University of Minnesota School of Public Health. His health-related research has included the Men's Internet Studies (MINTS), a series of web-based HIV prevention studies conducted with B.R. Simon Rosser and colleagues; an NIH-funded program developing and evaluating a web- and mobile-based falls-prevention intervention for high-risk elderly women; and, more recently, the development and pilot evaluation of a mobile application supporting self-management for people with accidental bowel leakage.

== Professional service ==
Konstan has held leadership positions in professional computing organizations, particularly the Association for Computing Machinery (ACM) and its Special Interest Group on Computer-Human Interaction (SIGCHI). He served as president of ACM SIGCHI from 2003 to 2006 and as chair of ACM's Special Interest Group Governing Board from 2006 to 2008, and served multiple terms on the ACM Council. He co-chaired ACM's Publications Board from 2013 to 2022, a period during which the board oversaw the organization's move to open-access publishing. He chaired the first ACM Conference on Recommender Systems in 2007 and chaired the ACM CHI 2012 conference. He also chaired the ACM Symposium on User Interface Software and Technology (UIST) in 2003 and the ACM Conference on Human Factors in Computing Systems (CHI) in 2012. Konstan has also served as program chair of many conferences, including ACM Multimedia, CSCW, and RecSys. Since 2021 he has served on the board of the American Society for Engineering Education's Engineering Research Council, becoming its Secretary/Treasurer in 2023.

== Awards and honors ==
Konstan was elected an ACM Fellow in 2008, an AAAS Fellow in 2011, and an IEEE Fellow in 2013. He was inducted into the CHI Academy in 2011 and received the ACM Software System Award in 2011 for work associated with the GroupLens collaborative filtering recommender systems.

In 2013, he received the SIGCHI Lifetime Service Award. His other honors include the George W. Taylor/CSE Alumni Society Award for Distinguished Teaching (2013) and the James Chen Award for best paper published in User Modeling and User-Adapted Interaction (2012).In 2016, Konstan and his collaborators received a WWW Seoul Test of Time Award for work recognized for its significance in the history of the World Wide Web.

In 2017, he received the SIGIR Test of Time Award, and a GroupLens paper received an AAAI Classic Paper Award honorable mention. In 2020, a GroupLens paper on learning new-user preferences in recommender systems received the ACM IUI Most Impactful Paper Award.In 2022, Konstan received the University of Minnesota's President's Award for Outstanding Service. He also received ACM's Outstanding Contribution to ACM Award. In 2026, Konstan received the ACM SIGCHI Lifetime Research Award, recognizing his contributions to human-computer interaction. The award was presented at the CHI 2026 conference in Barcelona.

== Selected publications ==
- Konstan, Joseph A.; Miller, Bradley N.; Maltz, David; Herlocker, Jonathan L.; Gordon, Lee R.; Riedl, John (1997). "GroupLens". Communications of the ACM. 40 (3): 77–87. doi:10.1145/245108.245126. ISSN 0001-0782.
- Herlocker, Jonathan L.; Konstan, Joseph A.; Borchers, Al; Riedl, John (August 1999). "An algorithmic framework for performing collaborative filtering". Proceedings of the 22nd annual international ACM SIGIR conference on Research and development in information retrieval. New York, NY, USA: ACM. pp. 230–237. doi:10.1145/312624.312682. ISBN 1-58113-096-1.
- Sarwar, Badrul; Karypis, George; Konstan, Joseph; Riedl, John (2001). "Item-based collaborative filtering recommendation algorithms". Proceedings of the 10th international conference on World Wide Web. New York, NY, USA: ACM. pp. 285–295. doi:10.1145/371920.372071. ISBN 1-58113-348-0.
- Herlocker, Jonathan L.; Konstan, Joseph A.; Terveen, Loren G.; Riedl, John T. (2004). "Evaluating collaborative filtering recommender systems". ACM Transactions on Information Systems. 22 (1): 5–53. doi:10.1145/963770.963772. ISSN 1046-8188.
- Konstan, Joseph A.; Riedl, John (2012-03-10). "Recommender systems: from algorithms to user experience". User Modeling and User-Adapted Interaction. 22 (1–2): 101–123. doi:10.1007/s11257-011-9112-x. ISSN 0924-1868.
- Harper, F. Maxwell; Konstan, Joseph A. (2015-12-22). "The MovieLens Datasets". ACM Transactions on Interactive Intelligent Systems. 5 (4): 1–19. doi:10.1145/2827872. ISSN 2160-6455.
- Bliss, Donna Z.; Gurvich, Olga V.; Konstan, Joseph A.; Johnson, Ryanne; McCormick, Jeannine; Muehlbauer, Marshall; Jamison, Dominique; Jennings, Emma; Benbenek, Mary; Conway, Molly; Weinberger, Alexandra; Kirchschlager, Casey; Richter, Holly E. (2025). "Development, usability, and randomized pilot feasibility study of a mobile application prototype supporting self-management of accidental bowel leakage". Continence. 15 102276. doi:10.1016/j.cont.2025.102276. ISSN 2772-9737. PMC 12652371. PMID 41311646.
