= Research Studios Austria =

Austrian research institution

Research Studios Austria ForschungsgesmbH
- Company type: private
- Founded: Salzburg, Austria (15 April 2008)
- Headquarters: Salzburg, Austria
- Products: easyrec, KnowledgePulse
- Services: Research & Development in AI
- Number of employees: 50
- Website: https://www.researchstudio.at

The Research Studios Austria Forschungsgesellschaft mbH (RSA FG) is a non-profit research institution in the area of eTechnologies and Smart Media. It currently operates a network of five research units called Studios cooperating with and creating research synergies among universities in Vienna, Linz, Salzburg and Innsbruck.

The RSA FG undertakes applied research projects. The research and development conducted at the Research Studios Austria is based on a process of rapid prototyping and a special research approach MIR (Modular Iterative Re-framing).

The Research Studios Austria FG competes for national and European research grants and funding in research excellence. It does contract research for clients in the private and public sectors and it receives the funding for its independent research from the Austrian Federal Ministry for Science and Research.

The current director is Peter A. Bruck.

== History ==
The Research Studios Austria have been established in 2003, and were part of the Austrian Institute of Technology (AIT) formerly known as Austrian Research Centers (ARC) until Spring of 2008. In April 2008, the Research Studios Austria were spun out into a new company and the Research Studios Austria Forschungsgesellschaft mbH was founded.

== Branches ==
Currently five different Studios are working in applied ICT research:

- Inter-Organisational Systems: eGovernment-eBusiness (IOS, Vienna)
- iSPACE (Salzburg)
- MicroLearning & Information Environments (MINE, Innsbruck/Salzburg/Linz/Vienna)
- Pervasive Computing Applications (PCA, Linz/Vienna)
- Smart Agent Technologies (SAT, Vienna)
