= Gorjan Jovanovski =

Macedonian eco-activist and engineer

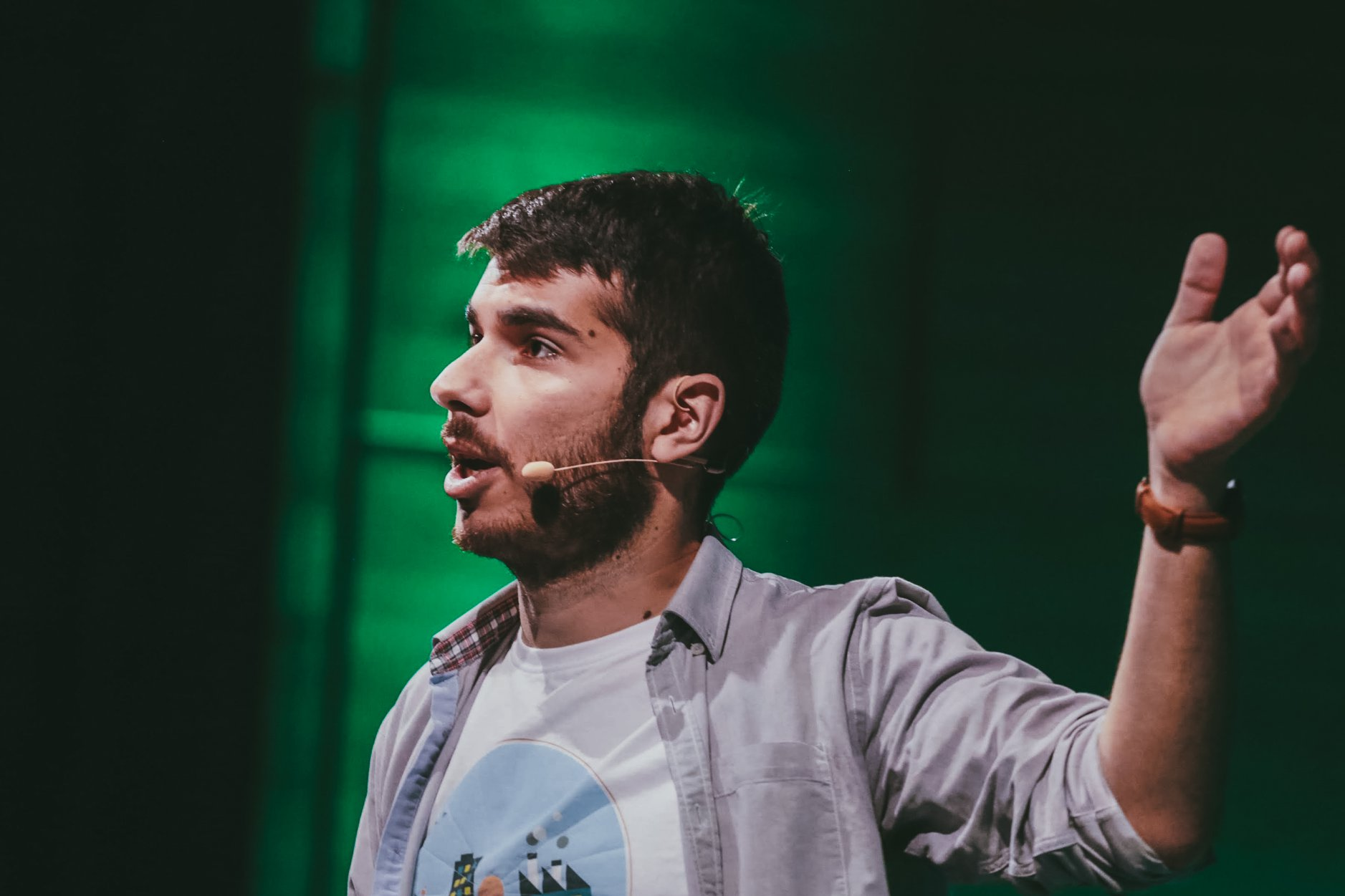
- Gorjan speaking at the AllWeb conference in North Macedonia, 2018 Gorjan giving a talk at a conference, 2018
- Born: Skopje, North Macedonia
- Education: Master of Software Engineering, University of Amsterdam
- Occupations: Activist; Programmer
- Known for: Activism, AirCare, hylosense
- Awards: European Young Innovator 2020
- Website: www.gorjan.rocks

Gorjan Jovanovski is a Macedonian eco-activist, entrepreneur and software engineer, working on raising awareness about air pollution through technology. In 2014, he created the AirCare mobile app, which uses open data to visualize air pollution, and its launch triggered nationwide protests in North Macedonia and Serbia by citizens demanding that local governments take more serious action against the issue.

== AirCare ==
AirCare, initially known as MojVozduh, is a mobile app that uses open data from government and volunteer air quality sensors to map and visualize pollution in the Balkans. Launched in December 2014, it currently has over 200,000 downloads, and is used a daily basis during high pollution months in the Balkans. AirCare accumulates data from government, volunteer and satellite measuring stations from the European Space Agency, aggregating them for easier consumption by end users. Pollutants include Particulate matter, Nitrogen dioxide, Carbon Monoxide, Sulfur Dioxide and Ozone.

Making the data available to the masses led to nationwide protests in North Macedonia and Serbia. In response, the "Plan for Clean Air" was released by North Macedonia's government. AirCare and Jovanovski's work has been covered by Forbes, The Guardian, NASA, and the UN.

In 2020, Gorjan was awarded European Young Innovator by the UN founded World Summit Awards, for his work on raising air pollution awareness through AirCare.

== 2018 TEDx talk ==
Jovanovski has given talks at multiple conferences on the topics of mobile apps and using technology for ecology activism. In 2018 he gave a TED talk at TEDx SittardGeleen titled "Data: the pathway to a better world". YouTube. TEDx Talks. 13 April 2018., about the founding of AirCare and the impact it had on public awareness about high pollution levels in North Macedonia.

== See also ==
- Internet activism
- Air Pollution
- Ecology
