= Combrex =

COMBREX: COMputational BRidges to EXperiments

Content
- Description: functional annotation of prokaryotic genomes.
- Organisms: Prokaryotes

Contact
- Research center: Boston University
- Authors: Richard J Roberts
- Primary citation: PMID 21097892
- Release date: 2010

Access
- Website: http://combrex.bu.edu

COMBREX is a multifaceted project that includes a database of gene annotations, functional predictions and recommendations based on Active Learning principles associated with millions of genes in prokaryotic genomes.

== About ==
COMBREX is a multifaceted project that aims to bring together the computational and experimental communities of biologists in the interest of improving our understanding of microbial gene function and accelerating the annotation of microbial gene function. The COMBREX project was co-founded by Simon Kasif, Richard Roberts and Martin Steffen as an international consortium with a headquarters at Boston University and over 100 experimental and computational collaborators. The project was inspired by a call for community action published in PLoS Biology by Richard J. Roberts.

== Content ==
=== A Database of genes and functions ===
This evolving database consists of experimentally determined and computationally predicted functions for more than three million microbial genes. Searching for a gene or genes of interest may be an end in itself, or it may be a first step toward contributing information to or seeking a grant from COMBREX. The database presently consists of genes from over 1000 completely sequenced bacterial and archaeal genomes, supplemented with a number of individual genes whose biochemical function has been experimentally determined. The genes are organized into sequence-similar, and likely isofunctional, groups determined by NCBI, referred to as Protein Clusters.

A color-coding system is used to identify which genes have experimentally determined functions, which have computationally predicted functions, and which have no known or predicted function (info). By necessity, "predicted functions" may encompass a broad range of specificity, and one of our longer range goals is to quantify this specificity. (For example, the predicted function "valine decarboxylase" is significantly more specific, and more readily verifiable, than "lyase", or even "carboxy-lyase".)

Identification of genes whose products have been experimentally verified is also not a trivial task, and so we have embarked on a project to create a comprehensive, manually curated set of all such genes, which we refer to as the Gold Standard Gene Database. This curated set is at present unique to the COMBREX database, and genes belonging to it are color-coded with a gold symbol.

=== Predictions of Gene Function ===
The COMBREX database serves as a venue for computational biologists to publicize their most informative gene function predictions. A major effort within the bio-informatics field has been the computational prediction of gene function. There have been significant advances in this field over the last decade or so, but many of these efforts have not realized their full potential to advance biological knowledge due to the fact that predictions are rarely experimentally tested, and predicted functions for individual genes made by competing methods are rarely directly compared.

The COMBREX database, besides drawing information from familiar sources such as NCBI and UniProtKB, also displays gene function predictions submitted by individual laboratories. Such predictions may be generated in large scale using computational algorithms, or may be made for individual genes by experimental or computational biologists well acquainted with a particular protein family or biochemical pathway. Thus, predictions made by different methods may be easily compared, contrasted, and examined by experimental biologists. This side-by-side display of function predictions from many sources is the heart of the interaction between computational and experimental communities that COMBREX hopes to foster.

=== Recommendation and prioritization of experiments based on Active Learning principles. ===
COMBREX uses simple principles as well as more sophisticated Active Learning methodologies to recommend the most informative experiments. These are experiments that are most likely to generate the most informative (in the mathematical sense of maximizing information gain) predictions for the largest number of proteins in the database. The most basic recommendations provide ranking of all proteins in a gene cluster in terms of their distance to other proteins. In the simplest case proteins near the center of a cluster are judged to be most informative because their distance to the other proteins in the cluster is relatively small. As a result, functional annotation of a "center" of a cluster is likely to result in the most accurate predictions for the other proteins in the cluster. In evolutionary terms these "cluster centers" are closest to the evolutionary ancestor of all the proteins in the cluster. Active Learning generalizes this intuition principle to produce recommendations for additional experiments that are likely to either produce accurate predictions or identify proteins that are not annotated correctly.

In addition to evolutionary analysis and Active Learning COMBREX also points to other criteria that might be considered in considering experiments. Such criteria include whether there is a structure available, conservation of the bacterial gene in the human genome (e.g. domain sharing), availability of computational or experimental evidence of gene function, phenotypical considerations (such as presence in a pathogen or relation to antibiotic resistance, pathogenicity or virulence) and others.

=== Grants for the Biochemical Characterization of genes ===
One of the missions of COMBREX is to issue small monetary grants for the experimental validation of specific gene predictions. The experimental determination of biochemical function for specific gene products serves to validate (or invalidate) the computational predictions made a priori. Thus, this experimental effort serves three goals: (1) it brings together directly the scientists who make gene function predictions and those who test them, (2) it evaluates computational methods based on how accurate their predictions are so they can be improved, and (3) it broadens the landscape of experimentally validated genes, improving our overall understanding of biology and of sequence-structure-function relationships.

The experimental investigation of the biochemical function of a single gene or small number of genes is often beneath the purview of large funding agencies. COMBREX is set up to issue small grants for exactly this type of work, and such grants are particularly suited for laboratories already familiar with the types of assays required for the intended experiments.

== Goals ==
=== Improved gene annotation ===
One of the current problems with gene and genome annotation is a lack of transparency with respect to source. It is often difficult to determine which functions have been determined experimentally and which are predicted computationally. Furthermore, for computationally predicted functions, the method used to make the prediction and the strength of the evidence are rarely stated. COMBREX has taken the first steps toward a more transparent system of annotation by (1) color-coding genes to distinguish observed from predicted functions, and (2) for many functions predicted by sequence similarity, identifying the experimentally validated "source gene" on which the prediction was based.

COMBREX is working towards a more completely traceable annotation system, in which every stated functional annotation is either experimentally determined, or is a prediction explicitly linked through a chain of evidence to an ultimate source of information. These sources will in many cases be experimentally validated genes, but in some cases will be annotations from existing databases whose sources are themselves not immediately apparent.

COMBREX is the first database that attempts to "computationally" identify the link to the experimental source of an annotation using homology. Other databases provide two types of evidence, e.g. inferred directly from experiments or inferred computationally. However, the inference cannot be typically traced to the experimental source of the annotation. COMBREX cannot guarantee that the "traces" it provides are accurate at this point but it enables biologists to make this determination directly by examining the link.

This system of identifying source genes and functions, and evidential links, will enable a dynamic system of annotation that is automatically updated as experimental evidence for new genes is determined, and as new predictive methods are developed. Such a dynamic system of gene functional annotation may help overcome the relatively high frequency of unannotated and misannotated genes that results from the static system used in many public databases. Furthermore, it will illuminate those genes whose biochemical functions are truly unknown, as opposed to those that are simply insufficiently annotated.

=== Improved predictive accuracy ===
Making gene functional predictions transparent is important, but equally important is making them as accurate as possible. Predictions need to be commensurate with the strength of evidence for them, such that they are as specific as the evidence will allow. Those that are not specific enough do not lend themselves to experimental testing, and those that are too specific for the underlying evidence run a high risk of being inaccurate. COMBREX is actively working on developing algorithms for functional prediction that can identify genes with novel or interesting functions, and whose results can sit beside the high-quality predictions received from collaborating computational groups. COMBREX's relatively conservative BLAST-based propagation of gene function represents a simple first step towards this goal.

=== Targeted experimental validation ===
Through its funding decisions, COMBREX can help broaden as well as deepen our understanding of biochemical gene function by encouraging experimental investigation of specific genes. The choice of which genes to validate is an important one: little overall new knowledge is gained by validating closely similar relatives of isofunctional genes, and validating experiments for genes with no specific predicted functions are unlikely to succeed. Furthermore, the landscape of what is already known is uneven, with many validated examples of some functions and few or no examples of others.

COMBREX wishes to develop a new, integrative model of research in which experiments are prioritized to close the largest gaps in our overall predictive understanding of gene function. Such a model favors the validation of genes that provide relatively large increases in knowledge, for example because their validated function results in a large number of new predictions for other genes. At an early stage COMBREX will introduce lists of "high priority" genes, which may be identified as being of significant predictive or biomedical value, and to which COMBREX members may nominate candidates. As a longer-term goal, COMBREX is working towards the use of machine learning techniques such as active learning to optimize the selection of such genes.

=== New technologies ===
COMBREX encourages the development of new technologies and cost-effective assays for gene function determination. The experimental validation effort described above amounts to a massively parallel application of low-throughput experiments via many small-scale grants. High-throughput assays that can analyze many gene products in parallel may result in the determination of function for many genes simultaneously, and may help make large strides in our overall understanding of gene function.
