= GroupLens Research =

Computer science research lab

Coordinates: 44.974280°N 93.232502°W

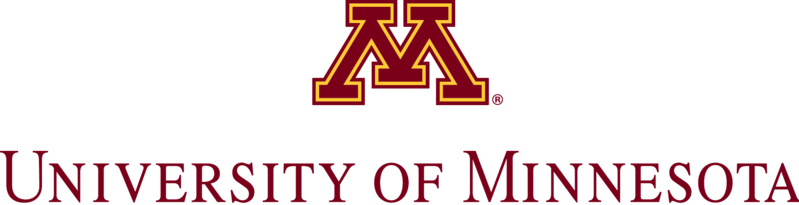

- Established: 1992
- Field of research: recommender systems, social computing
- Faculty: 5
- Staff: 2
- Students: 20 postgraduate students
- Location: Minneapolis, Minnesota, United States
- Operating agency: College of Science and Engineering, University of Minnesota
- Website: www.grouplens.org

GroupLens Research is a human–computer interaction research lab in the Department of Computer Science and Engineering at the University of Minnesota, Twin Cities specializing in recommender systems and online communities. GroupLens also works with mobile and ubiquitous technologies, digital libraries, and local geographic information systems.

The GroupLens lab was one of the first to study automated recommender systems with the construction of the "GroupLens" recommender, a Usenet article recommendation engine, and MovieLens, a popular movie recommendation site used to study recommendation engines, tagging systems, and user interfaces. The lab has also gained notability for its members' work studying open content communities such as Cyclopath, a geo-wiki that was used in the Twin Cities to help plan the regional cycling system.

== History ==
=== Formation ===
In 1992, John Riedl and Paul Resnick attended the CSCW conference together. After they heard keynote speaker Shumpei Kumon talk about his vision for an information economy, they began working on a collaborative filtering system for Usenet news. The system collected ratings from Usenet readers and used those ratings to predict how much other readers would like an article before they read it. This recommendation engine was one of the first automated collaborative filtering systems in which algorithms were used to automatically form predictions based on historical patterns of ratings. The overall system was called the "GroupLens" recommender, and the servers that collected the ratings and performed the computation were called the "Better Bit Bureau". This name was later dropped after a request from the Better Business Bureau. "GroupLens" is now used as a name both for this recommender system, and for the research lab at the University of Minnesota.

A feasibility test was done between MIT and the University of Minnesota and a research paper was published including the algorithm, the system design, and the results of the feasibility study, in the CSCW conference of 1994.

In 1993, Riedl and Resnick invited Joseph Konstan to join the team. Together, they decided to create a higher-performance implementation of the algorithms to support larger-scale deployments. In summer 1995 the team gathered Bradley Miller, David Maltz, Jon Herlocker, and Mark Claypool for "Hack Week" to create the new implementation, and to plan the next round of experiments.

In the Spring of 1996, the first workshop on collaborative filtering was put together by Resnick and Hal Varian at the University of California, Berkeley. There, researchers from projects around the US that were studying similar systems came together to share ideas and experience.

=== Net Perceptions ===
In the summer of 1996, David Gardiner, a former Ph.D. student of Riedl's, introduced John Riedl to Steven Snyder. Snyder had been an early employee at Microsoft, but left Microsoft to come to Minnesota to do a Ph.D. in Psychology. He realized the commercial potential of collaborative filtering, and encouraged the team to found a company in April 1996. By June, Gardiner, Snyder, Miller, Riedl, and Konstan had incorporated their company, and by July they had their first round of funding, from Hummer Winblad Venture Partners venture capital company. Net Perceptions went on to be one of the leading companies in personalization during the Internet boom of the late 1990s, and stayed in business until 2004. Based on their experience, Riedl and Konstan wrote a book about the lessons learned from deploying recommenders in practice. Recommender systems have since become ubiquitous in the online world, with leading vendors such as Amazon and Netflix deploying highly sophisticated recommender systems. Netflix even offered a $1 million prize for improvements in recommender technology.

When the EachMovie site closed in 1997, the researchers behind it released the anonymous rating data they had collected, for other researchers to use. The GroupLens Research team, led by Brent Dahlen and Jon Herlocker, used this data set to jumpstart a new movie recommendation site called MovieLens which has been a very visible research platform, including a detailed discussion in a New Yorker article by Canadian journalist Malcolm Gladwell, and a report in a full episode of ABC Nightline.

Between 1997 and 2002 the group continued its research on collaborative filtering, which became known in the community by the more general term of recommender systems. With Joe Konstan's expertise in user interfaces, the team began exploring interface issues in recommenders, such as explanations, and meta-recommendation systems.

=== Studying online communities ===
In 2002, GroupLens expanded into social computing and online communities with the addition of Loren Terveen, who was known for his research of social recommender systems such as PHOAKS.

In order to broaden the set of research ideas and tools they used, Riedl, Konstan, and Terveen invited colleagues in social psychology (Robert Kraut and Sara Kiesler, of the Carnegie Mellon Human Computer Interaction Institute), and economic and social analysis (Paul Resnick and Yan Chen of the University of Michigan School of Information) to collaborate. The new, larger team adopted the name CommunityLab, and looked generally at the effects of technological interventions on the performance of online communities. For instance, some of their research explored technology for enriching conversation systems, while other research explored the personal, social, and economic motivations for user ratings.

In 2008 GroupLens launched Cyclopath, a computational geo-wiki for bicyclists within a city.

In 2010, GroupLens won the annual ACM software system award. Riedl died in 2013.

Brent Hecht joined the GroupLens faculty in 2013, focusing on geographic human-computer interaction. Lana Yarosh joined the GroupLens faculty in 2014; she works with social computing and child-computer interaction. A third professor, Haiyi Zhu, joined in 2015. Haiyi has published research on Facebook and other social networks. Stevie Chancellor, a human-centered computing and social computing researcher, joined the GroupLens faculty in 2020.

== Contributions ==
- The MovieLens recommender system: MovieLens is a non-commercial movie recommender system that has been running since 1997 with over 164,000 unique visitors as of 2009, who have provided over 15 million movie ratings.
- MovieLens ratings datasets: In the early days of recommender systems, research was slowed down by the lack of publicly available datasets. In response to requests from other researchers, GroupLens released three datasets: the MovieLens 100,000 rating dataset, the MovieLens 1 million rating dataset, and the MovieLens 10 million rating dataset. These datasets became the standard datasets for recommender research, and have been used in over 300 papers by researchers around the world. The dataset is also being used for teaching about recommender technology.
- MovieLens tagging dataset: GroupLens added tagging to MovieLens in 2006. Since then, users have provided over 85,000 applications of 14,000 unique tags to movies. The MovieLens 10 million ratings dataset also includes a 100,000 tag applications dataset for researchers to use.
- Information leakage from recommender datasets: a paper in the information retrieval conference analyzed the privacy risks to users of having large recommender datasets released. The basic risk discovered is that an anonymized dataset might be combined with public information to identify a user. For instance, a user who has written about his preference for movies on online forums could be associated with a specific row in the MovieLens datasets. In some cases, these associations might leak information the user would prefer to keep private.
- Wikipedia research: The study of value and vandalism in Wikipedia published in 2007 described the concentration of contribution across Wikipedia editors. This paper was one of the first to focus on the length of time that a contribution survives within Wikipedia as a measure of its value. The paper also investigated the effects of vandalism on Wikipedia readers, by measuring the probability that a view of a page would capture that page in a vandalized state. GroupLens has also explored ways to help editors find pages which they can effectively contribute to with the SuggestBot recommender. The group has also explored the evolution of the norms in Wikipedia that determine which articles are accepted or rejected, and the effect of changes in those norms on the Long Tail of Wikipedia articles. GroupLens has also explored the functioning of the informal peer review system within Wikipedia to discover ways the decisions being made appear to be influenced inappropriately by ownership, and that experience does not seem to change editor performance very much. GroupLens researchers have also explored visualizations of the edit history of Wikipedia articles. In 2011, the GroupLens researchers completed a scientific exploration of gender imbalance in Wikipedia's popular editors, resulting in finding that there was a large gap between male and female editors.
- Shilling recommender systems: GroupLens has explored ways that users of recommender systems can attempt to inappropriately influence the recommendations given to other users. They call this behavior shilling, because of its relationship to the practice of hiring associates to pretend to be enthusiastic customers. They showed that some types of shilling are likely to be effective in practice. One concern about shilling is that the false predictions may change the reported opinions of later users, further corrupting the recommendations.
- Cyclopath: Beginning in 2008, GroupLens launched Cyclopath, a computational geo-wiki for local bicyclists. Cyclopath has since been used by hundreds of cyclists within the Twin Cities. More recently, Cyclopath has been adopted by the Twin Cities Metropolitan Council to help plan the regional cycling system.
