= Sheeel =

Kuwaiti trading website

Sheeel.com
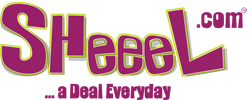
- Website type: Electronic commerce
- Available in: English and Arabic
- Headquarters: Kuwait
- Owner: Taw9eel
- Website: www.sheeel.com
- Commercial: Yes
- Launched: January 19, 2011; 15 years ago
- Current status: Active

Sheeel.com (Arabic: شيييل) is a Kuwaiti deal-of-the-day website generally offering one discounted product a day, covering several categories such as electronics, household goods, and toys. The origin of the website name comes from the Arabic language, where the word "Sheeel", (Arabic:شيييل) is the affirmative form of the verb "raise" which is usually used for picking up items and buying goods at bazaars.

== History ==
Sheeel.com sold its first deal on January 19, 2011.

== Awards ==
Sheeel.com was awarded first prize in the Kuwait e-Awards under the e-commerce category three months after its launch. The Kuwait e-Awards are sponsored by the Kuwait Foundation for the Advancement of Sciences (KFAS), and are arranged in cooperation with the World Summit Award.

== Business ==
The website sells one discounted deal a day. The selection of products covers various categories including but not limited to Electronics, Toys, Fashion, Fragrances, Home Medical Equipment, and Appliances. Occasionally, the website will randomly offers bonus deals when a daily product sells out early. The website's marketing efforts are focused on driving traffic by using social media outlets such as Twitter and Facebook. In terms of accessibility, Sheeel.com is viewable as a normal website using a desktop browser and as a Web app using smartphones.

Sheeel.com serves the Kuwaiti market only.
