= Steven Paul Rudolph =

- Steven Paul Rudolph
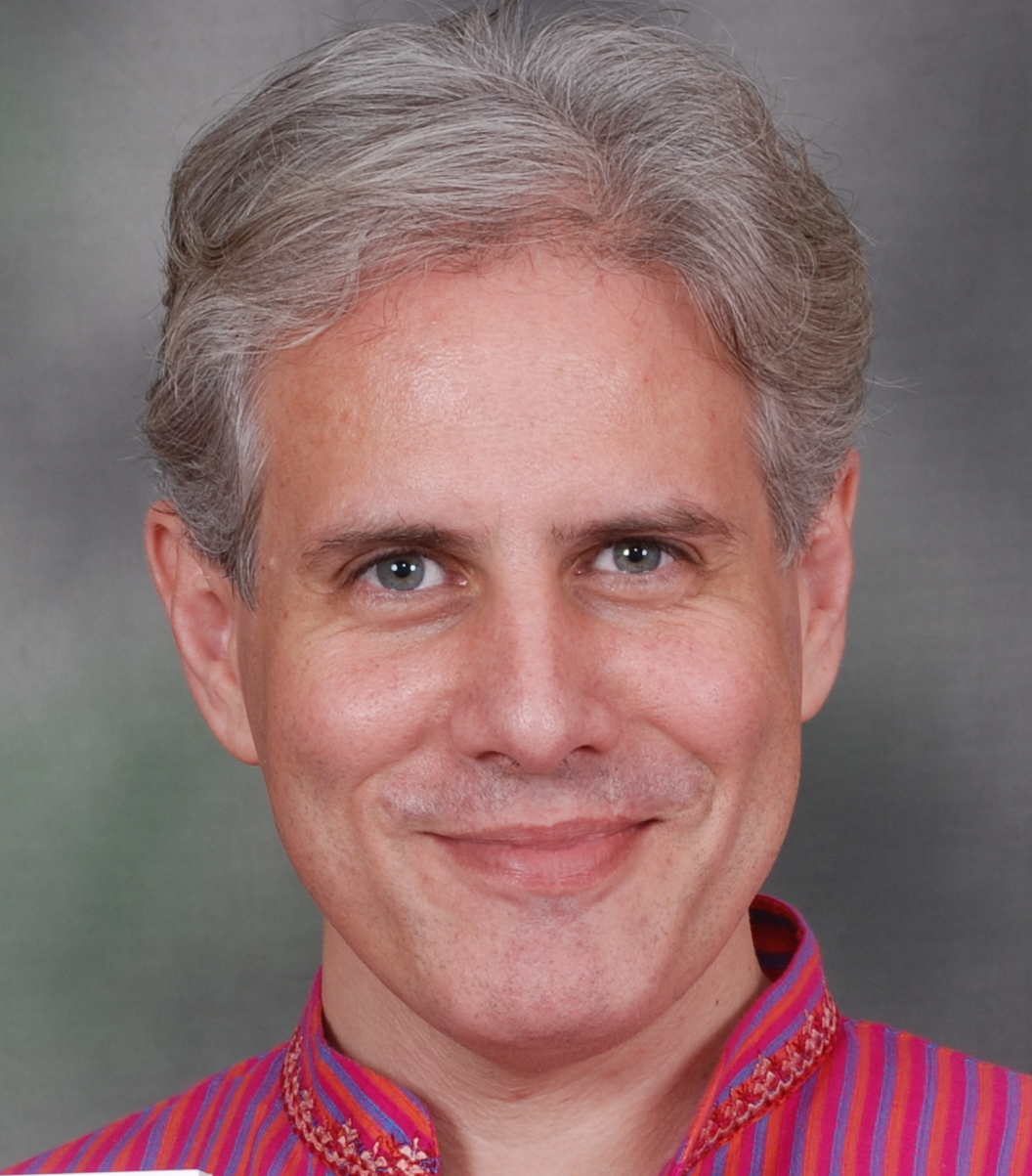
- Steven Paul Rudolph
- Born: Wayne, New Jersey
- Education: Masters in Education
- Alma mater: University of Florida Temple University, Tokyo
- Occupation: Educator
- Writing career
- Notable work: Development of the Multiple Natures psychometric framework
- Notable awards: Co-winner of World Summit Award for Teledoc, an e-Health Project carried out by Jiva Institute in 2003 ED Leadership Award by Ed Leadership Foundation in 2009

Steven Paul Rudolph is an American educator, author and public speaker based in India. He is the proponent of a novel concept in education called Multiple Natures, which is a psychological framework that helps in understanding people's natures and personality traits that result in particular behavioral patterns, specifically related to learning and work.

Rudolph is the co-founder and Educational Director of Jiva Institute in Faridabad. He conducts life skills workshops and educational lectures for students, parents and educators and training sessions for academic counsellors.

== Early life and education ==
Rudolph did his schooling from Wayne Valley High School in Wayne, New Jersey and graduated with a B.A. degree in English from the University of Florida. He started his career as a teacher at the Center for American Language, New York, and also taught English as a Foreign Language at Kanda Gaigo Gakuin (Kanda Institute of Foreign Languages) in Japan. He received his master's degree in education from Temple University, Tokyo. In 1993. Rudolph moved to India in 1994.

== Educational initiatives ==
In 1995, Rudolph set up the first Internet connection in an Indian school – Jiva Public School in Faridabad – through tie-ups with ERNET (Education and Research Network, Government of India), Apple Computer, and Intel. Through this initiative, he introduced the Internet into hundreds of schools across the country.

In 1997, Rudolph launched a series of modern computer books that familiarized Indian students and teachers with new uses of the computer. His books advocated computers as a tool for learning, communicating, drawing and creating music, as opposed to the existing curriculum that primarily dealt with learning programming languages and how to use operating systems.

In 2001, Rudolph authored textbook materials based on Howard Gardner’s framework of Multiple Intelligences. Known as ICOT (India’s Curriculum of Tomorrow), the curriculum incorporated High Order Thinking Skills (HOTS), technology, and value-based activities.

In 2009, Rudolph authored his first book, The 10 Laws of Learning, which was specifically written for Indian parents. The book proposes a number of educational principles, which, if followed, can lead to increased levels of learning.

In 2011, he authored his second book, Solving the Ice Cream Dilemma. A book on careers, Solving the Ice Cream Dilemma is published by Times Group Books and seeks to help parents help their kids in solving their career confusion.

== Multiple Natures ==
In June 2008, Rudolph introduced his theory of ‘Multiple Natures’, a psychological model that attempts to understand people's natures and defining personality traits. The model seeks to explain why certain people are drawn more towards certain activities and careers. It also reasons that the dominance or weakness of a particular nature is dependent on the events and circumstances faced by a person during the course of his or her life. In all, Rudolph has identified nine such natures in each person - Protective, Educative, Administrative, Creative, Healing, Entertaining, Providing, Entrepreneurial, and Adventurous.

== Publications ==
- Project-Based Learning, Newbury House, Tokyo
- ICOT Series of Textbooks (over 50) for Jiva Institute
- The 10 Laws of Learning (2009, Random House India) ISBN 978-8184000894
- Solving the Ice Cream Dilemma (2011, Times Books) ISBN 978-9380942650

== Awards ==
- Co-winner of World Summit Award for Teledoc, an e-Health Project carried out by Jiva Institute in 2003
- ED Leadership Award by Ed Leadership Foundation in 2009

== See also ==
- Multiple Natures
