= Multiple Natures =

Multiple Natures is a personality-type framework developed by renowned American educator and researcher, Steven Paul Rudolph. It attempts to account for people's natures and personality traits that lead to particular behavioral patterns, especially with respect to their work and learning. The framework helps individuals understand their inner qualities so they can achieve their potential and find success and happiness in life.

== The nine multiple natures ==
Rudolph has identified nine Natures that are possessed by each person to varying degrees.

=== Protective ===
People with strong protective natures have the tendency to protect themselves, others, bodies, ideas or practices from harm, damage, injury, or loss. They think first and foremost about others' safety and security. They are lovers of justice, and are the first ones to raise their voices when they see anyone being wronged.

Ideal careers: Police officers, lawyers, critics, journalists, social activists, politicians, etc.

=== Educative ===
People with a strong educative nature have the tendency to acquire knowledge, skills, or experience to teach, instruct, guide, or inform others. They find immense pleasure in teaching others and their greatest satisfaction comes from helping someone understand something.

Ideal careers: Teachers, corporate trainers, spiritual masters, etc.

=== Administrative ===
People with a strong administrative nature have the tendency to focus on details, organize and get work accomplished, and delegate responsibility. They have an innate urge to make plans and goals — and to see them through to completion. They are concerned with the details, and are great task masters — creating to-do lists, schedules, and managing people effectively.

Ideal careers: Managers, diplomats, human resource managers, personal assistants, public relations professionals, etc.

=== Creative ===
‘People with a strong creative nature have the tendency to generate original ideas or works that have value,' as defined by renowned British author, Sir Ken Robinson. They are always full of ideas and engage themselves in activities of innovation and invention. They are great in brainstorming sessions, and make excellent problem solvers.

Ideal careers: Artists, writers, fashion designers, R&D professionals, architects, advertising professionals, etc.

=== Healing ===
People with a strong healing nature have the tendency to guide others to recover from physical, mental, emotional, or spiritual imbalance, or pain. They get their greatest pleasure from helping others stay healthy and fit. On hearing about a problem, they are eager to search for the cause as well as for a solution.

Ideal careers: Doctors, massage therapists, counselors, psychologists, etc.

=== Entertaining ===
People with a strong entertaining nature have the tendency to amuse others or attract, focus or maintain people's attention on themselves or their work. They love to entertain others, creating experiences that evoke emotions. They crave being the center of attention — making jokes, singing songs, acting, mimicking, and so on.

Ideal careers: Singers, musicians, dancers, actors, comedians, radio jockeys, magicians, etc.

=== Providing ===
People with a strong Providing Nature have the tendency to invest their time or interests to help, assist or care for others. They have a built-in drive to serve others. They take pleasure in helping others be happy and assisting them in achieving their goals.

Ideal careers: Chefs, waiters, airline hostesses, real estate agents, social workers, etc.

=== Entrepreneurial ===
People with a strong entrepreneurial nature have the tendency to take up projects or create opportunities of a commercial or humanitarian nature, using a high degree of independence, where the reward may be monetary or involve self-satisfaction. Their greatest pleasure comes from creating financial value. Entrepreneurs think in numbers and figures, and are constantly on the move to bring together people, concepts, and capital in a way that generates money.

Ideal careers: Business owners, sales people, marketing professionals, general managers, trade marketing managers, etc.

=== Adventurous ===
People with a strong Adventurous Nature have the tendency to seek out unusual challenges or place themselves far outside the space of what an average person would consider normal or safe. They enjoy putting their minds and bodies to the test to see what is possible. Adventurers get a high from surfing the edge – from exploring the boundaries of life, and their own capabilities.

Ideal careers: Athletes, astronauts, explorers, researchers, etc.

== Core applications ==
Rudolph's Multiple Natures model has been applied to parenting, teaching, career counseling and self-discovery. It has implications for classroom teaching and can help teachers understand their students better and design learning activities based on specific interests of each child. The framework also has implications for the corporate sector. It can help organizations find the right people for the right job by identifying employees' closest Nature types and assigning them the work profile that best suits their interests.

== Multiple natures test ==
Based on the Multiple Natures framework is the Multiple Natures Test, a career test that helps students find their ideal careers and streams based on their unique natures, strengths and abilities.
