= Smart Agent Technologies =

Austrian research organization

Studio Smart Agent Technologies
- Type: private
- Founded: Vienna, Austria (15 April 2008)
- Headquarters: Vienna, Austria
- Products: easyrec
- Services: Research & Development in AI
- Number of employees: 57
- Parent: Research Studios Austria
- Website: http://sat.researchstudio.at

The Studio Smart Agent Technologies (SAT) is part of the Research Studios Austria ForschungsgesmbH, a non-profit research organization. It aims to facilitate the transfer of academic research into commercial applications, thus implementing an innovation pipeline from universities into markets. To this end, SAT cooperates with both universities and other academic institutions, as well as innovative companies.

The Studio SAT competes for national and European research grants and funding in research excellence. It does contract research for clients in the private and public sectors, and it receives funding for its independent research from the Austrian Federal Ministry for Science and Research.

== History ==
The Studio Smart Agent Technologies was founded in 2003 as one of the first research units of the Research Studios Austria, a division of the Austrian Institute of Technology (AIT) formerly known as Austrian Research Centers (ARC). In April 2008 the Research Studios Austria were spun out into a new company and the Research Studios Austria Forschungsgesellschaft mbH was founded.

During the years 2004 and 2005 SAT accompanied the development of a mobile content download platform by 3united and Ericsson as a research partner concerning personalization.

From 2006 to 2008 SAT guided research activities concerning semantic systems and recommender systems for Verisign Communications GmbH, the Viennese branch of VeriSign.

With its flagship project Easyrec, an open source recommender engine, SAT launched an incubator for spreading the ideas and usage of personalization in early 2010.

== Research ==
The main research areas of SAT include:

- Recommender Systems
- Personalization
- Semantic Systems
- Data Mining and Visualization
- Intelligent Agent Solutions
