= Lana Yarosh =

Professor

Svetlana “Lana” Yarosh is an associate professor in the University of Minnesota College of Science and Engineering at University of Minnesota. She is a Distinguished University Teaching Professor and recipient of the McKnight Presidential Fellowship. Yarosh does research as part of the GroupLens Research group.

Her research expertise in human computer interaction focuses on embodied interaction in social computing systems.

She is a member of the Special Interest Group on Computer-Human Interaction (ACM SIGCHI), Member Institute of Digital Media and Child Development, Anita Borg Institute Systers, and a senior member of the Association for Computing Machinery (ACM).

== Biography ==
=== Education ===
Yarosh earned her Bachelor of Science degree in Computer Science and Psychology in the University of Maryland, College Park in 2005, and she graduated from Georgia Institute of Technology as a Doctor of Philosophy, specializing in Human-Centered Computing in 2012.

=== Career & research ===
Yarosh worked at AT&T labs for two years before joining the University of Minnesota College of Science and Engineering as an assistant professor. Yarosh's research investigates human-computer interaction (HCI). Within HCI, her work focuses on child-computer interaction and social computing. Her work has led to numerous patents including a system and method for enabling mirror video chat using a wearable display device and a system and method for providing separate communication zones in a large format videoconference.

=== Teaching ===
Yarosh began her teaching career in 2014 at the University of Minnesota. She's taught a number of classes in the Department of Computer Science and Engineering including: CSCI 1133: Introduction to Computing and Programming Concepts, CSCI 5115: User Interface Design, Implementation and Evaluation, CSCI 5127W: Embodied Computing: Design & Prototyping, CSCI 8001: Introduction to Research in Computer Science, CSCI 8002: Introduction to Research in Computer Science II, and CSCI 8980: Social Connectedness Technologies. Content from some of these courses is available on the online platform Coursera.

Yarosh collaborated with others to develop and deploy a YouTube CrashCourse series on Artificial Intelligence which launched on August 9, 2019.

== Honors and awards ==
- McKnight Presidential Fellows Award (2020–2023)
- CSCW Best Paper Honorable Mention Award (2021)
- CHI Best Paper Honorable Mention Award (2021)
- CHI Best Paper Honorable Mention Award (2019)
- Morse-Alumni Award (2019)
