= Peter A. Bruck =

Austrian computer scientist

Peter A. Bruck (born 1950 in Vienna) is former CEO and Chief Researcher of the Research Studios Austria Forschungsgesellschaft mbH and founder of the spin-off KnowledgeFox. Bruck is also honorary President of the ICNM-International Center for New Media, Salzburg, which selects and promotes best practice in ICT applications and multimedia content nationally in Austria, at the European level and globally under auspices of the United Nations. Chairman of the Board the European Academy of Digital Media-EADiM, Netherlands, Chairman of the Board of Directors the World Summit Award within the framework of the United Nations process of the World Summit on the Information Society (WSIS) and President of the European Academy of MicroLearning (Austria)

== Biography ==
=== Studies and early Research ===
He studied jurisprudence, Social sciences and economics at the University of Vienna. As a Fulbright Scholar he completed as Master of Arts in sociology (University of Iowa). Graduate Studies and Humanities Fellow (PH.D in communication) at the McGill University, Montreal finished his academic education.

=== Management and Research ===
He has been professor at Carleton University, Ottawa, and professor pro temp. at the University of Salzburg. Bruck has founded and served as the Director of the Centre for Communication, Culture and Society at Carleton University (1985–1990) and has been senior consulting partner in ICRA - International Communications Research Associates, Ottawa, Canada (1987–1995). In Europe, he headed the international Research Program in Economy and Future of the Print Media initiated by the Austrian Association of Newspaper Publishers and funded by the Ministry for Science and Research (1990–1993).

As Academic Director, Bruck founded the University Applied Arts and Sciences for Telecommunication, Multimedia and Information Management in Salzburg (1995–1998) and started in 1996 Salzburg Research Forschungsgesellschaft m.b.H., the official research organisation of the State of Salzburg in 1998. Bruck was CEO and served as Head of Research till January 2001. From 2002 to 2008, he was general manager of the Research Studios Austria, (Department of the Austrian Research Centers).

Bruck has been appointed Honorary Professor of Information Economy and New Technologies at the Institute of Economics, Faculty of Law, at the University of Salzburg (since 1994) and Adjunct Research Professor of Communication at Carleton University, Ottawa, Canada (since 1993).

Since 1996, Bruck initiated a number of activities to develop best practice in new media and e-content including the Austrian State Prize for Multimedia and e-Business, the Europrix MultiMediaArt, the leading contest for the selection and promotion of e-content creation in Europe, and the United Nations World Summit Award on e-content and creativity with participation from 168 countries.

Bruck was awarded the Austrian Cross of Honour for Science and Art in 2005.

=== Current Research ===
The research interests of Peter A. Bruck are currently focused on the development of new communication technologies and information structures and the resulting changes in business processes, business, culture and society. One special focus is the research on microlearning and mobile learning in the context of digital media as well as gamification of learning.

== Bibliography ==
Bruck has published and edited over 40 books and research reports and numerous scholarly as well as professional articles in the fields of communication and new media studies, media and information economics, telecommunication development, organisational study and sociology. He has produced radio and video documentaries, TV events, a number of multimedia publications and over the last eight years a series of yearly CD-ROMs and DVDs on the best European multimedia products.

- A Proxy for Knowledge: Arms Control, Verification and the News Media. (Editor & Author) Carleton University International Proceedings, Ottawa, 1988. pp 230.
- News Media and Terrorism. CCCS Publications, Ottawa, 1988. pp 100.
- Communication For and Against Democracy (Editor & Author with Marc Raboy). Montreal: Black Rose Books, 1989. pp 252.
- Medien im Krieg - Die zugespitzte Normalität. (Hg.) Salzburg: Österreichische Gesellschaft für Kommunikationsfragen, 1991. pp 88.
- Das Österreichische Format: Kulturkritische Beiträge zur Analyse des Medienerfolges Neue Kronen Zeitung. (Hg. und Author) Wien: Edition Atelier, 1991. pp 256.
- Die Mozart Krone: Zur Empörung eines Boulevardblattes und der medialen Konstruktion eines Kulturkampfes. (Hg. und Autor) Wien/St. Johann: Österreichischer Kunst und Kulturverlag, 1991. pp 159.
- Werbeboom und Medien - Zur Krise am Werbemarkt, eine medienökonomische Bewertung. Wien: Verlag Buchkultur, 1993. pp 246.
- Medienmanager Staat - Von den Versuchen des Staates, Medienvielfalt zu ermöglichen. Medienpolitik im internationalen Vergleich. (Hg. und Autor) München: Verlag R. Fischer, 1994. pp 658.
- Print unter Druck - Zeitungsverlage auf Innovationskurs. Verlagsmanagement im internationalen Vergleich. (Hg. und Autor) München: Verlag R. Fischer, 1994. pp 618.
- Ökonomie und Zukunft der Printmedien - Neue Chancen für Verlagsmanagement und Medienpolitik. Wien: Österreichischer Kunst- und Kulturverlag, 1994. pp 234.
- Digitales Österreich - Informationshighway: Initiativen, Projekte, Entwicklungen. (mit Andrea Mulrenin). Innsbruck – Wien: Studienverlag, 1995.
- Die ganz normale Vielfältigkeit des Lesens. (mit Günther Stocker). Opladen: Westdeutscher Verlag, 1996.
- Strategische Entwicklungen für die Europäische Verlagsindustrie im Hinblick auf das Jahr 2000. (gemeinsam mit Thomas Baubin). Studie von Andersen Consulting und Ienm im Auftrag der Europäischen Kommission (1996).
- Österreichs Content Industry. Bestandsaufnahme und Marktstrategien. (mit Hannes Selhofer). Wien: Buchkultur, 1997. pp 144.
- Schulen am Netz. Innovative Projekte in Österreich. (Hrsg.) (mit Günther Stocker)Wien: Hölder-Pichler-Tempsky, 1997. pp 208.
- X-ROM. Multimediaproduktion mit Kindern und Jugendlichen. (Hgs. mit Guntram Geser). Innsbruck/Wien: Studienverlag, 1999.
- Schulen auf dem Weg in die Informationsgesellschaft. (mit Guntram Geser). Innsbruck/Wien: StudienVerlag, 2000.
- Understanding the European Content Industries. A Reader on the Economic and Cultural Contexts of Multimedia. (Editor & Author) Amsterdam/Berlin/ Oxford/Tokyo/Washington DC: IOS Press, 2002
- EUROPRIX Top Talents. The Book on Innovation in Multimedia. Wien: Österreichischer Kunst und Kulturverlag, 2003
- Der österreichische Multimedia und e-Business Guide. Wien: Bundesministerium für Wirtschaft und Arbeit gemeinsam mit Wirtschaftskammer Österreich, 2001, 2002, 2003.
- E-Content - Voices from the ground. Market Condition and Creative Developments in 30 countries (with Osama Maznar). Digital Empowerment Foundation, New Delhi, India, 2003
- High Performance Multimedia: content technologies and market needs. Amsterdam/Berlin/ Oxford/Tokyo/Washington DC: IOS Press, (2005)
- E-Content. Technologies and Perspectives for the European Market. (Editor) Springer-Verlag GmbH & Co. KG Berlin Heidelberg in cooperation with Springer-Verlag New York Inc. and Springer-Verlag Tokyo Inc. (2005)
- Microlearning: Emerging Concepts, Practices and Technologies. (Editor with Hug, T., Lindner, M.) Innsbruck University Press, Innsbruck, Austria (2006)
- Micromedia & eLearning 2.0: Gaining the big picture. (Editor with Hug, T., Lindner, M.) Innsbruck University Press, Innsbruck, Austria (2007)
- Microlearning & Capacity-building. (Editor with Lindner, M.) Innsbruck University Press, Innsbruck, Austria (2008)
- The American Dream in the 21st Century - Continuity and Change. Klett, Germany (2010)
