= Preference elicitation =

Task of generating recommendations to a user

Preference elicitation refers to the problem of developing a decision support system capable of generating recommendations to a user, thus assisting in decision making. It is important for such a system to model user's preferences accurately, find hidden preferences and avoid redundancy. This problem is sometimes studied as a computational learning theory problem. Another approach for formulating this problem is a partially observable Markov decision process. The formulation of this problem is also dependent upon the context of the area in which it is studied.

== Overview ==
With the explosion of on-line information new opportunities for finding and using electronic data have been generated, these changes have also brought the task of eliciting useful information to the forefront. Researchers as well as major online catalog companies have come up with algorithms and prototypes of systems that can aid a user to be able to navigate through a complex and huge information space using some information from the user in the form of answers to certain queries or ratings to certain items etc. depending upon the domain of the information space.

== See also ==
- Active learning (machine learning)
- Cold start
- Collaborative filtering
- Collective intelligence
- Long tail
- Personalized marketing
- Product finders
- Revealed preference
