= Psychographic filtering =

Psychographic filtering is located within a branch of collaborative filtering (user-based) which anticipates preferences based upon information received from a statistical survey, a questionnaire, or other forms of social research. The term Psychographic is derived from Psychography which is the study of associating and classifying people according to their psychological characteristics. In marketing or social research, information received from a participant’s response is compared with other participants’ responses and the comparison of that research is designed to predict preferences based upon similarities or differences in perception. The participant should be inclined to share perceptions with people who have similar preferences. Suggestions are then provided to the participant based on their predicted preferences. Psychographic filtering differs from collaborative filtering in that it classifies similar people into a specific psychographic profile where predictions of preferences are based upon that psychographic profile type. Examples of psychological characteristics which determine a psychographic profile are personality, lifestyle, value system, behavior, experience and attitude.

== Method ==
Research data is collected and analyzed through quantitative methods, yet the manner in which the questions are presented share similarities used within qualitative methods. Participants respond to questions offering perceived choice. The participants’ choice is reflective of their psychological characteristics. This perceived choice (presented throughout the research method) is designed to score a participant and categorize that participant according to their respective score. The categories (psychographic profiles) used to assign people, reflect personality characteristics which the researchers can analyze and use for their particular purposes.

== Application ==
Psychographic filtering and collaborative filtering are still within experimental stages and therefore have been not been extensively used. The techniques are most effective when they are used to indicate preference for a single, constant item (i.e. a horror book written by one author) rather than recommending a composition of characteristics (i.e. a newspaper article on war) which varies in perspective from publisher to publisher. For the item to be perceived in accordance with the psychographic profile, it must be defined within a specific category, opposed to being encompassing of many categories (where many preferences overlap). Major problems with this type of research are whether it can be applied to items which are constantly changing in scope and updated regularly and whether people will participate sufficiently to create psychographic profiles.

== See also ==
- Market segmentation
- Psychology
- Collaborative filtering
