= World Summit Awards =

- Awarded for: Digital content and innovative applications.
- Location: Austria
- First award: 2003; 23 years ago
- Final award: 2021

Highlights
- Government & Citizen Engagement: ManoSeimas.lt
- Health & Well Being: FibriCheck
- Learning & Education: Inspirelearn
- Environment & Green Energy: Peer to peer Solar Trading on Blockchain in Uttar Pradesh
- Inclusion & Empowerment: MobilityMojo
- Website: wsa-global.org/wsa-awards/winners

The World Summit Awards (WSA) rewards Information and Communications Technologies projects that have a positive impact on society at the local level. The award was initiated in 2003, within the framework of the United Nations World Summit on the Information Society. After the UN General Assembly adopted Resolution 56/183. The awards are open to companies, organizations, or individuals from any of the UN and the UNESCO Member States. They are divided into 8 different categories. The world summit awards are managed by the International Center for New Media (ICNM), a non-profit organization based in Salzburg, Austria. ICNM was founded by Peter A. Bruck, in 2002.

== History ==
=== WSA History ===
Following a proposal by the Government of Tunisia, the International Telecommunication Union, adopted Resolution 73 (Minneapolis, 1998), in the Plenipotentiary Conference, in Minneapolis 1998, held on October 12–6 November. Resolution 73 asked the Council to deliberate on the ITU's contribution to holding the Summit, with the following goals:

1) establishing an overall framework identifying a joint understanding of the information society; 2) drawing a strategic plan of action and 3) identifying the role of various partners to ensure coordination in all Member States. It also requested the Secretary - General to coordinate with the international organizations and other international actors, and called for measures specifically designed to improve and strengthen the presence of the union in diverse regions[2]. The United Nations General Assembly on 21 December 2001, adopted resolution 56/183, endorsing the holding of a World Summit on the Information Society (WSIS), with the goal(link[3]). The Resolution dictated that the WSIS would be held in two phases[4]. The first phase of WSIS, took place in 2003 in Geneva, Switzerland, from 10 to 12 December. And the second phase of WSIS, was set in Tunis, from 16 to 18 November 2005.

WSIS Follow-up was carried out by ECOSOC in the resolution 2006/46, on July 28, 2006, titled "Follow-up to the World Summit on the Information Society and review of the Commission on Science and Technology for Development". This Resolution is placed within the context of the annual consideration by ECOSOC. It states its responsibilities in Article 2 on the follow-up[5]. ECOSOC decided to appoint the Commission on Science and Technology for Development (CSTD) as an assistant Commission to the Council, and was established to be the focal point of the system-wide follow-up of WSIS. To this end, the ITU and its partners, organize a WSIS Forum, located in Geneva, every year. To this day, the World Summit Award participates in workshops and exhibitions in order to demonstrate: "the richness and diversity of e-Content globally". The overall Review of the execution of the Implementation of the Outcomes of the World Summit on the Information Society, was held in 2015 by the UN General Assembly, which adopted Resolution A/70/125 (which called for the alignment between the WSIS process and 2030 Agenda for Sustainable Development).

==== First phase of the summit: Geneva ====
In Geneva in 2003, more than 11,000 participants from over 175 countries attended. The Declaration of Principles makes reference to the challenge of harnessing the potential of information and communication, as well as recognizes that "Connectivity is a central enabling agent in building the Information Society" (Declaration of Principles Geneva .B2.21). The Government of the Republic of Austria decided to entrust the global challenge of the Information Society of the UN Agenda to the International Center for New Media and its honorary chairman Prof. Dr. Peter A. Bruck. to launch the World Summit Award. Therefore, the World Summit Award was thought to present to the UN States and delegates on the diversity and creative use of ICTs.

==== First Edition WSA ====
The first edition of the World Summit Awards was in 2003. The World Summit on the Information Society was introduced by the UN. Secretary-General Kofi Annan, and the first winners of the World Summit Awards were awarded in 2003. 136 UN Member States participated in this edition with 803 e-content applications. The UN Secretary-General Kofi Annan in conjunction with the first WSA Winners was awarded in 2003 by Romano Prodi (president of the European Commission) and Wolfang Schüssel (Federal Chancellor of Austria).

Adama Samassékou emphasized his mission to ensure that information and communication technologies were to "be put into the service of all people, regardless of language, culture, gender or geographic location".

==== UNESCO - Patronage to WSA ====
In 2004, UNESCO granted patronage to the World Summit Award 2005, as it contributed to overcoming the digital gap and at the same time encouraged the creation of "locally relevant, high quality multimedia content".

== WSA Categories ==
WSA Categories reflect the UN WSIS line. They derive from the United Nations' World Summit on the Information Society (WSIS), UN Geneva Agenda, the Tunis Action Plan and the United National Sustainable Development Goals (UN SDGs). They are regularly updated in order to meet and adapt to the development of the markets and societal changes. There are 8 WSA Categories. Every year, five projects are awarded in each of the eight categories. The categories are the following:

WSA CATEGORY	KEY WORDS	WINNERS
Government & Citizen Engagement	Services, open data and democratic participation	Information on Winners
Health & Well Being	Medical Care, Sport and Lifestyle	Information on Winners
Learning & Education	Knowledge, Science and Skills	Information on Winners
Environment & Green Energy	Climate, Sustainable Resources and Agriculture	Information on Winners
Inclusion & Empowerment	Diversity, Gender, Justice and Human Rights	Information on Winners
Culture & Tourism	Heritage, Entertainment and Subcultures	Information on Winners
Business & Commerce	Innovative Services, Security, Finance, Marketing	Information on Winners
Smart Settlements & Urbanization	Mobility, Productive Work, Sustainable Living	Information on Winners
Young Innovators (for young social entrepreneurs under 26)	Taking Action on the SDG's	Information on Winners

== WSA Grand Jury ==
WSA Grand Jury is a Jury meeting that is considered highly relevant in the whole WSA Process. A jury of international experts evaluates and selects the 5 best projects from each category. The jury process is a moderated, democratic vote in two stages, typically held as grand jury events about two months before the winners' events and the Congress.

Moreover, since 2003, WSA has celebrated the WSA Grand Jury to select the best content and innovative applications. The meetings have taken place in several locations, such as Bahrain, Croatia, India, Abu Dhabi, Hong Kong, Azerbaijan, Berlin and - latest - Jakarta.

== WSA Network ==
WSA is a global community that seeks to combine voices, perspectives, and insights of entrepreneurs, and national and corporate experts from different fields and expertise. Coming from NGOs, Governments, and Professional Associations. Always with the main goal to reach the UN Sustainable Goals.

=== National Experts and nomination process ===
WSA works with and through a network of national experts that expands over 170 countries. National Experts are responsible for the pre-selection, therefore the nomination process of the solutions in their countries. Their task is to scout the national ICT markets for suitable applications, that fit the evaluation criteria of the WSA. In some countries, the national experts hold official national pre-selection competitions, and thus their deadline applications may differ from the WSA Global Application.

=== Youth Ambassadors ===
Youth Ambassadors are part of the WSA Network. They are Young Innovators who support and engage youth in the entrepreneurship sector. Moreover, they have diverse backgrounds and support the national pre-selection of entries of WSA.

=== Board ===
The WSA Board consists of high-level international ICT Experts from 15 countries. And it is chaired by the WSA Founder and Chairperson Prof. Dr. Peter. A. Bruck.

=== Alumni ===
A general overview of the alumni of the content selected by the World Summit Awards: WSA has selected 854 winners from 97 countries, from 7781 nominations, coming from 187 UN Member States. WSA Young Innovators has chosen more than 210 winners in their 12 editions, from more than 4.413 submissions.

== WSA Events ==
WSA conducts several events throughout the year in order to enhance and connect the WSA Network. These events consist of workshops, side-events and international speakers. Moreover, it provides the opportunity to transfer knowledge, in addition to allow transfer of the latest trends, developments and challenges in the sector.

=== WSA Global Congress ===
WSA holds every year a 3-day congress. The WSA Global Congress is an international conference that present and promote the 40 international WSA Winners. It has taken place in Mexico, Canada, Egypt, Sri Lanka, Brazil, Portugal, Switzerland, Tunisia, Austria, UAE, Singapore, and Austria.

In addition, at the congress, workshops and interactive discussions are offered in order to discuss, reflect and exchange ideas on how ICTs and digital innovations, can have a positive impact on society, in line with the UN Sustainable Goals. It is a diverse event with start-ups, social entrepreneurs, experts, and speakers from over 80 countries. The event embraces an e-content-related conference program. The final gala includes the winner's ceremony.

==== WSA Global Champions ====
At the WSA Global Congress, 9 WSA Global Champions are chosen among the 45 WSA Global Winners. There are five winners per category. The WSA Global Champions are presented at the WSA Award Ceremony. Every WSA Global Congress, the 9 Global Champions are selected as the best digital tools for helping to "narrow the societal gaps". The selection process relies on a jury process of national experts, and other experts in the field of ICT.

On the occasion of the WSIS+10 review held in Paris in February 2013, a special online jury evaluated all 200 winning projects of WSA's 10-year history and selected eight all-time global champions.

=== WSA Regional Events ===
==== European Young Innovators Festival ====
It is a festival that takes place in Graz, located in the south of Austria. It aims to bring together the WSA European Community with one objective: to connect those who use digital technology to achieve the UN SDGs. It is a festival where the young social entrepreneurs select the best digital solutions to improve European societies. Moreover, joined by international speakers, mentors, thought leaders, and ecosystem shakers.

In 2020, the European Youth Award (EYA) was integrated into WSA. EYA was an initiative that highlighted and encouraged purpose-driven digital entrepreneurship. Since then, it has become the European Young Innovators Award.

=== Innovation Events ===
Are specialized events focused on regional and local levels, fixed on matching the local ecosystem. WSA selects international experts in order to offer benefits to the local audience, and at the same time, foster intense knowledge exchange. It organizes keynotes and interactive sessions, on topics of social entrepreneurship, particularly targeting young people and the importance of the best practices in digital innovation.

== WSA winners database ==
The World Summit Awards (WSA) maintains an online database of its winners, documenting digital solutions recognized by the award since its establishment in 2003. The database includes winning projects from countries around the world and allows users to explore winners by year and category. As of 2026, WSA states that more than 600 winners have been recognized from more than 82,000 nominations.

The complete database of WSA winners is available on the official WSA Winners website.

== See also ==
- List of computer-related awards
