= Collaborative model =

Linguistic theory

In psycholinguistics, the collaborative model (or conversational model) is a theory for explaining how speaking and understanding work in conversation, specifically how people in conversation coordinate to determine definite references.

The model was initially proposed in 1986 by psycholinguists Herb Clark and Deanna Wilkes-Gibbs. It asserts that conversation partners must act collaboratively to reach a mutual understanding – i.e. the speaker must tailor their utterances to better suit the listener, and the listener must indicate to the speaker that they have understood.

In this ongoing process, both conversation partners must work together in order to establish what a given noun phrase is referring to. The referential process can be initiated by the speaker using one of at least six types of noun phrases: the elementary noun phrase, the episodic noun phrase, the installment noun phrase, the provisional noun phrase, the dummy noun phrase, and/or the proxy noun phrase. Once this presentation is made, the listener must accept it either through presupposing acceptance (i.e. letting the speaker continue uninterrupted) or asserting acceptance (i.e. through a continuer such as "yes", okay", or a head nod). The speaker must then acknowledge this signal of acceptance. In this process, presentation and acceptance goes back and forth, and some utterances can simultaneously be both presentations and acceptances. This model also posits that conversationalists strive for minimum collaborative effort by making references based more on permanent properties than temporary properties and by refining perspective on referents through simplification and narrowing.

== History ==
The collaborative model finds its roots in Grice's cooperative principle and four Gricean maxims, theories which prominently established the idea that conversation is a collaborative process between speaker and listener.

However, until the Clark & Wilkes-Gibbs study, the prevailing theory was the literary model (or autonomous model or traditional model). This model likened the process of a speaker establishing reference to an author writing a book to distant readers. In the literary model, the speaker is the one who retains complete control and responsibility over the course of referent determination. The listener, in this theory, simply hears and understands the definite description as if they were reading it and, if successful, figures out the identity of the referent on their own.

This autonomous view of reference establishment wasn't challenged until a paper by D.R. Olson was published in 1970. It was then suggested that there very well could be a collaborative element in the process of establishing reference. Olson, while still holding to the literary model, suggested that speakers select the words they do based on context and what they believe the listener will understand.

== Clark and Wilkes-Gibbs ==
Clark and Wilkes-Gibbs criticized the literary model in their 1986 paper; they asserted that the model failed to account for the dynamic nature of verbal conversations.

“First, in conversation unlike writing, speakers have limited time for planning and revision. They need to overcome this limitation, and in doing so they may exploit techniques possible only in conversational settings. Second, speech is evanescent. The listener has to attend to, hear, and try to understand an utterance at virtually the same time it is being issued. That requires a type of process synchronization not found in reading. And third, listeners in conversations aren’t mute or invisible during an utterance. Speakers may alter what they say midcourse based on what addressees say and do.”

In the same paper, they proposed the Collaborative Model as an alternative. They believed this model was more able to explain the aforementioned features of conversation. They had conducted an experiment to support this theory and also to further determine how the acceptance process worked. The experiment consisted of two participants seated at tables separated by an opaque screen. On the tables in front of each participant were a series of Tangram figures arranged in different orders. One participant, called the director, was tasked with getting the other participant, called the matcher, to accurately match his configuration of figures through conversation alone. This process was to be repeated 5 additional times by the same individuals, playing the same roles.

The collaborative model they proposed allowed them to make several predictions about what would happen. They predicted that it would require many more words to establish reference the first time, as the participants would need to use non-standard noun phrases which would make it difficult to determine which figures were being talked about. However, they hypothesized that later references to the same figures would take fewer words and a shorter amount of time, because by this point definite reference would have been mutually established, and also because the subjects would be able to rely on established standard noun phrases.

The results of the study confirmed many of their beliefs, and outlined some of the processes of collaborative reference, including establishing the types of noun phrases used in presentation, and their frequency.

=== Steps in Collaborating Reference ===
The following actions were observed in participants working towards mutual acceptance of a reference;

- Initiating or proposing a reference
- Passing judgement on the reference
- Refashioning a noun phrase
- Accepting the reference

=== Grounding ===
Grounding is the final stage in the collaborative process. The concept was proposed by Herbert H. Clark and Susan E. Brennan in 1991. It comprises the collection of "mutual knowledge, mutual beliefs, and mutual assumptions" that is essential for communication between two people. Successful grounding in communication requires parties "to coordinate both the content and process".

The parties engaging in grounding exchange information over what they do or do not understand over the course of a communication and they will continue to clarify concepts until they have agreed on grounding criterion. There are generally two phases in grounding:

- Presenting utterance(s) - speaker presents utterance to addressee
- Accepting utterance(s) - addressee accepts utterance by providing evidence of understanding

== Other supporting studies ==
Subsequent studies affirmed many of Clark and Wilkes-Gibbs' theories. These included a study by Clark and Michael Schober in 1989 that dealt with overhearers and contrasting how well they understand compared to direct addressees. In the literary model, overhearers would be expected to understand as well as addressees, while in the collaborative model, overhearers would be expected to do worse, since they are not part of the collaborative process and the speaker is not concerned with making sure anyone but the addressee understands.

The study conducted by the pair mimicked the Clark/Wilkes-Gibbs study, but included a silent overhearer as part of the process. The speaker and addressee were allowed to converse, while the overhearer attempted to arrange his figures according to what the speaker was saying. In different versions of this study, overhearers had access to a tape recording of the speaker's directions, while in another they simply all sat in the same room.

The study found that overhearers had significantly more difficulty than addressees in both experiments, therefore, according to the researchers, lending credence to the collaborative model.

== Opposing viewpoints ==
The literary model described above still stands as a directly opposing viewpoint to the collaborative model. Subsequent studies also sought to point out weaknesses in the theory. One study, by Brown and Dell, took issue with the aspect of the theory that suggests that speakers have particular listeners in mind when determining reference. Instead, they suggested, speakers have generic listeners in mind. This egocentric theory proposed that people's estimates of another's knowledge are biased towards their own and that early syntactic choices may be made without regard to the addressees' needs, while beliefs about the addressees knowledge did not affect utterance choices until later on, usually in the form of repairs.

Another study, in 2002 by Barr and Keysar, also criticized the particular listener view and partner-specific reference. In the experiment, addresses and speakers established definite references for a series of objects on a wall. Then, another speaker entered, using the same references. The theory was that, if the partner-specific view of establishing reference was correct, the addressee would be slower to identify objects(as measured by eye movement) out of confusion because the reference used had been established with another speaker. They found this not to be the case, in fact, reaction time was similar.

== See also ==
- Collaborative filtering
- Discourse
- Grounding in communication
