= David C. Stark =

American sociologist

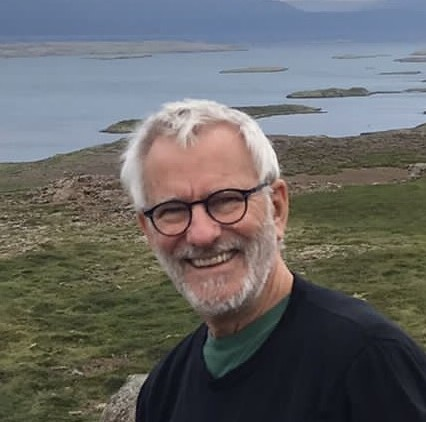
- Stark in 2024.
- Born: David Charles Stark; 1950 (age 75–76); Enid, Oklahoma
- Awards: Honorary Doctorate, École normale supérieure Paris-Saclay (2013); Roger V. Gould Prize (2011); W. Richard Scott Award (2011); Visiting Scholars Fellowship, Russell Sage Foundation (2002); Guggenheim Fellowship (2002)

Academic background
- Education: Princeton University (B.A., 1972); Harvard University (Ph.D. Sociology, 1982)
- Thesis: Coalition Politics at Work : New Class Configurations in Capitalist and State-socialist Societies (1982)

Academic work
- Discipline: Sociology
- Sub-discipline: Economic Sociology, Science and Technology Studies, Social Network Analysis
- Institutions: Columbia University
- Doctoral students: Gina Neff
- Notable ideas: Heterarchy, Recombinant Property, Structural Folds, Algorithmic Management
- Website: https://davidcstark.net/

David Charles Stark is Arthur Lehman Professor of Sociology at Columbia University, where he served as chair of the sociology department and currently directs the Center on Organizational Innovation. He was formerly an External Faculty Member of the Santa Fe Institute. He is well-cited in the fields of economic sociology, social networks, science and technology studies, and social change and development.

== Biography ==
Stark was born in 1950 in Enid, Oklahoma. He was awarded a scholarship to attend Princeton University for his undergraduate studies, where he received a B.A. (summa cum laude) in 1972. During his time at Princeton, he took part in the student anti-war protest movement. This, along with other ongoing processes of social change, led Stark to sociology as an academic discipline, which he saw as a "lens through which to study society." Stark continued his studies in sociology at Harvard University. While at Harvard he worked with Theda Skocpol, who was in the process of writing her seminal book, States and Social Revolutions. Stark received a Ph.D. in sociology from Harvard in 1982, which was written under the supervision of Skocpol and, later, Alessandro Pizzorno. Stark's dissertation, Coalition Politics at Work: New Class Configurations in Capitalist and State-socialist Societies, explored the relationship between Taylorist scientific management and Leninist economic planning.

After receiving his Ph.D., Stark joined the faculty at Duke University in its Department of Sociology. The following year, he was invited by Pierre Bourdieu to join the Centre de sociologie européenne in Paris as a visiting research fellow, a recommendation of Luc Boltanski. There he worked alongside Bourdieu and Boltanski, as well as others in the Actes de la Recherche en Sciences Sociales milieu, including Bruno Latour, Alain Desrosières, and Laurent Thévenot. Through his visiting fellowship at the CSE, Stark was exposed to the beginnings of the "new pragmatic sociology" in French social and economic thought, including its central notion of the multiplicity of "economies of worth." Throughout the 1980s, Stark spent much of his time between Paris, continuing his involvement in the new pragmatic sociology and its nascent Groupe de Sociologie Politique et Morale, and the socialist Hungary, studying the impacts of Kádárist economic reforms.

During much of the 1990s, Stark continued his field research on organizations and social change in European (formerly) socialist states during their economic liberalization and transition to market democracies. Much of this work was conducted with political scientist Laszlo Bruszt, including a jointly-authored book, Postsocialist Pathways: Transforming Politics and Property in East Central Europe, published in 1998.

In 1997, Stark was appointed Arthur Lehman Professor of Sociology at Columbia University. In 2000, he and anthropologist Monique Girard established Columbia University's Center on Organizational Innovation (COI).

Stark has been a visiting fellow at numerous institutions, including at the Berlin Institute for Advanced Study, Sciences Po in Paris, the Institute for Advanced Study at Zhejiang University in China, Copenhagen Business School, the Netherlands Institute for Advanced Study, the Russell Sage Foundation in New York City, the Center for Advanced Study in the Behavioral Sciences in Palo Alto, the Institute for Advanced Study/Collegium Budapest, the Ecole des Hautes Etudes en Sciences Sociales in Paris, the Social Science Research Center Berlin (WZB), and the Institute for Human Sciences in Vienna. He has held professorships at Bielefeld University, the Max Planck Institute, the University of Warwick, the London School of Economics, École normale superieure Paris-Saclay (formerly ENS Cachan), Cornell University, and the University of Canterbury. Stark's scholarship has received many awards and honors, including the Roger V. Gould Prize, the Viviana Zelizer Award, the Polányi Károly Prize, the W. Richard Scott Award, the Richard R. Nelson Prize, the Ashby Prize, fellowships from the Guggenheim Foundation and Russel Sage Foundation, and a Doctor Honoris Causa (Honorary Doctorate) from the École normale supérieure de Cachan.

== Work ==
Stark has been a leading contributor to the new economic sociology since the 1980s, focusing on developments in organizational forms since the late 19th century, professional and managerial classes, social networks, and practices of valuation. His work has often involved creating or clarifying key concepts for the methodology of socioeconomic analysis, such as "heterarchy," "recombinant property," "permanently beta," "structural folds," and "algorithmic management." His work with Balazs Vedres has developed a combination of network and sequence analytic methods, which have played a key role in 21st century approaches to social sequence analysis.

=== Heterarchy ===
During his time as a fellow at Centre de sociologie européenne in Paris and as a member of the nascent Groupe de Sociologie Politique et Morale (GSPM), Stark was an "early adopter" of analytical methods that recognized the multiple "economies of worth" at play in social processes of valuation. One of the consequences of Stark's participation in the GSPM, where he worked alongside Luc Boltanski and Laurent Thevenot during the writing of their landmark On Justification, along with research collected from his ethnographic studies in various organizations, has been a centering and ongoing development of the concept of "heterarchy." While "heterarchy" was first coined by Warren McCulloch in the context of neurobiology and systems theory, Stark's "heterarchy" named what he originally observed as an "emerging organizational form," one characterised by "cognitive ecologies that facilitate the work of reflexive cognition":

"In contrast to the vertical authority of hierarchies, heterarchies are characterized by more crosscutting network structures, reflecting the greater interdependencies of complex collaboration. They are heterarchical, moreover, because there is no hierarchical ordering of the competing evaluative principles."

While Stark's engagement with the concept of heterarchy began with his ethnographic studies on experiments in economic liberalization in socialist Hungary, further fieldwork conducted in post-socialist Europe the United States provided additional support for its significance within the study of organizations. Heterarchy has remained a prominent theme in Stark's work, which has included ethnographic research on post-socialist firms, new media startups, digital interface design, the rebuilding of Manhattan after the 9/11 attacks, and derivatives trading rooms. Stark's work since the early 2000s has been strongly influenced by early American pragmatism, in particular the thought of John Dewey, combining the problem of "multiple worlds of worth" associated with the new economic sociology and the problem of "multiple publics" in Dewey's political writings. Stark's 2009 book The Sense of Dissonance collated and expanded research collected in the previous two decades, further emphasizing the importance of heterarchical organization and "heterarchical politics" in meeting the challenges of 21st century governance.

=== Recombinant Property ===
Connected to Stark's involvement in the GSPM and his fieldwork in state socialist and postsocialist enterprises has been his coining of the term "recombinant property" to describe processes of economic transition during and after the collapse of the Soviet Bloc. Stark's concept of "recombinant property" criticizes theories of economic transition in the traditions of both Marxism and modernization theory, highlighting "the emptiness of the toggle-switch theory of 'market transition' that posits public ownership and state subsidies on one side and private property and markets on the other." For Stark, early postsocialist Hungary was an exemplar in this regard, whose emerging property forms blurred "the boundaries of public and private," "the organizational boundaries of enterprises," and "the boundedness of justificatory principles." Its recombinant processes of asset transition pointed to the "limiting" notion of a "postsocialist mixed economy," defined by essential oppositions of public and private, market and redistribution, and capitalism and socialism, and to the imperative of studying and comparing capitalisms "in the plural."

=== Algorithmic Management ===
Since the late 2010s, Stark has been a prominent figure in debates over the nature of governance and organization in societies increasingly mediated by digital platforms and algorithmic decision-making technologies. Stark's work with Elena Esposito has explored the use of ranking and ratings systems as a means of "orienting second-order observation" and of navigating "the uncertainties of our relationship with the world, with society, and with ourselves."

Stark has written extensively on the related notion of "algorithmic management" and on the broader question of how to conceptualize the phenomenon of managerial and supervisory duties being increasingly delegated to automated systems utilizing continuous data collection and artificial intelligence. Stark has criticized the popular conception of algorithmic management as continuous with Taylorist scientific management that dominated the 20th century. Contrary to conceptions of algorithmic management as "Scientific Management 2.0" or "digital Taylorism," Stark has argued that algorithmic management represents an alternative to both the scientific and collaborative management paradigms of the 20th and 21st century diverging from either in organizational form, objects of management, ideology, modality, and accountability.

== Selected articles ==
- "Principles of Algorithmic Management." Organization Theory, 2024, 15(4) (with Pieter Vanden Broeck).
- "Vision, Decision, Revision: Finding Topics, Audiences, and Voices." pp. 1–24 in David Stark (Ed.) Practicing Sociology: Tacit Knowledge for the Sociological Craft. Columbia University Press, 2024.
- "Questioning Humans versus Machines: Artificial Intelligence in Class Conflict." Administrative Science Quarterly, 2022, 67(3): 42–6.
- "Observational Learning in Networks of Competition: How structures of attention among rivals can bring interpretive advantage." Organization Studies, 2023, 44(2): 253-276 (with Matteo Prato).
- "Racial Attention Deficit." Science Advances, 2021, 7(38) (with Sheen S. Levine and Charlotte Reypens).
- "Algorithmic Management in the Platform Economy." Sociologica, 2020, 14(3):47-72 (with Ivana Pais).
- "The Performance Complex". pp. 1–27 in David Stark (Ed.) The Performance Complex. Oxford: Oxford University Press.
- "Testing and Being Tested in Pandemic Times." Sociologica, 2020, (14(1):67-94.
- "Put to the test: For a New Sociology of Testing." British Journal of Sociology, 2020, 71(3):423-443
- "Underground Testing: Personas as Probes in Underground Music." British Journal of Sociology, 2020, 71(3):527-589.
- "What's Observed in a Rating? Rankings as Orientation in the face of Uncertainty." Theory, Culture & Society, 2019, 36(4):3-26 (with Elena Esposito).
- "The Möbius Organizational Form: Make, Buy, Cooperate, or Co-opt?." Sociologica, 2018, 12(1):65-80 (with Elizabeth WatKins).
- "For What It's Worth." Research in the Sociology of Organizations, 2017, 52:383-397.
- "Game Changer: The Topology of Creativity." American Journal of Sociology, January 2015, 120(4):1144-1194 (with Mathijs de Vaan and Balazs Vedres).
- "Ethnic Diversity Deflates Price Bubbles." Proceedings of the National Academy of Sciences, December 2014, 111(52): 185240-18529 (with Sheen S. Levine, Evan P. Apfelbaum, Mark Bernard, Valerie L. Bartelt, and Edward J. Zajac).
- "Political Holes in the Economy: The Business Network of Partisan Firms in Hungary." American Sociological Review, October 2012, 77(5): 700-722 (with Balazs Vedres).
- "Structural Folds: Generative Disruption in Overlapping Groups." American Journal of Sociology, January 2010, 115(4): 1150-1190 (with Balazs Vedres).
- "PowerPoint in Public: Digital Technologies and the New Morphology of Demonstration." Theory, Culture & Society, 2008, 25(5): 31-56 (with Verena Paravel).
- "Social Times of Network Spaces: Network Sequences and Foreign Investment in Hungary." (with Balazs Vedres) American Journal of Sociology, March 2006, 111(5): 1368–1411.
- "Socio-technologies of Assembly: Sense-making and Demonstration in Rebuilding Lower Manhattan." (with Monique Girard) In David Lazer and Viktor Mayer-Schönberger, eds., Governance and Information: The Rewiring of Governing and Deliberation in the 21st Century. New York and Oxford: Oxford University Press, 2007.
- "How to Recognize Opportunities: Heterarchical Search in a Trading Room." pp. 84–101 in Karin Knorr Cetina and Alexa Preda, eds., The Sociology of Financial Markets. Oxford: Oxford University Press (with Daniel Beunza).
- "Tools of the Trade: The Socio-Technology of Arbitrage in a Wall Street Trading Room." (with Daniel Beunza) Industrial and Corporate Change, vol. 13, no. 1, 2004, pp. 369–401.
- "Permanently Beta: Responsive Organization in the Internet Era." (with Gina Neff) In Philip E.N. Howard and Steve Jones, eds., Society Online: The Internet In Context. Thousand Oaks, CA: Sage, 2003, pp. 173–188. ISBN 978-0-7619-2708-2
- "Distributing Intelligence and Organizing Diversity in New Media Projects." (with Monique Girard) Environment and Planning A, vol. 34, no 11, November 2002, pp. 1927–1949. ISSN 0308-518X
- "Ambiguous Assets for Uncertain Environments: Heterarchy in Postsocialist Firms," In Paul DiMaggio, ed., The Twenty-First-Century Firm: Changing Economic Organization in International Perspective. Princeton University Press, 2001, pp. 69–104. ISBN 978-0-691-11631-0
- "Recombinant Property in East European Capitalism." American Journal of Sociology. January 1996, vol. 101, no. 4, pp. 993–1027.

== Books ==
- Practicing Sociology: Tacit Knowledge for the Sociological Craft, (Editor). Columbia University Press, 2024.
- The Performance Complex: Competition and Competitions in Social Life, (Editor). Oxford and New York: Oxford University Press.
- Moments of Valuation: Exploring Sites of Dissonance, (Co-editor with Ariane Berthoine Antal and Michael Hutter). Oxford and New York: Oxford University Press, 2015.
- This Place, These People: Life and Shadow on the Great Plains, (with Nancy Warner). Columbia University Press, 2014.
- The Sense of Dissonance: Accounts of Worth in Economic Life, Princeton University Press, 2009.
- Postsocialist Pathways: Transforming Politics and Property in East Central Europe (with László Bruszt). New York and Cambridge: Cambridge University Press, 1998 ISBN 978-0-521-58035-9
- Restructuring Networks in Postsocialism: Legacies, Linkages, and Localities (Co-editor with Gernot Grabher), London and New York: Oxford University Press, 1997. ISBN 978-0-19-829020-9
- Remaking the Economic Institutions of Socialism: China and Eastern Europe (Co-editor with Victor Nee), Stanford: Stanford University Press, 1989. ISBN 978-0-8047-1495-2
