= Robert E. Kraut =

American social psychologist

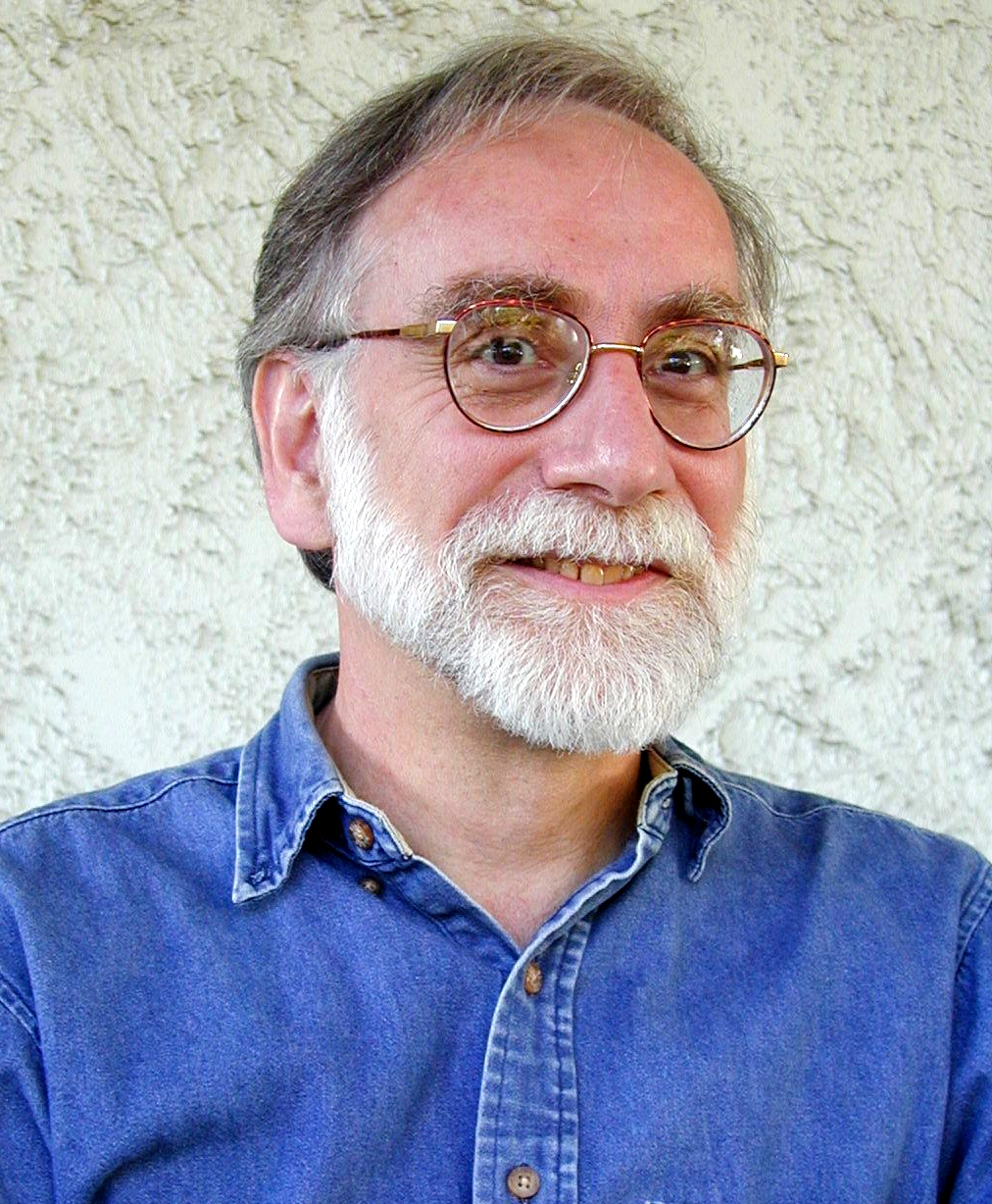
- Born: August 30, 1946 (age 80)
- Citizenship: United States
- Education: Lehigh University (B.A., 1968); Yale University (Ph.D., 1973)
- Awards: Golden Fleece Award, CHI Academy, Fellow Association for Psychological Science, Fellow, Association for Computing Machinery
- Scientific career
- Fields: Social psychology, Human-Computer Interaction
- Workplaces: Carnegie Mellon University (1993– ) Bell Communications Research (1984–1993); Princeton University (1983–1988); Bell Labs (1980–1983); Cornell University (1974–1981); University of Pennsylvania (1972–1974)
- Doctoral students: Laura Dabbish

Robert E. Kraut (born August 30, 1946) is an American social psychologist who studies human-computer interaction, online communities, internet use, group coordination, computers in organizations, and the role of visual elements in interpersonal communication. He is a Herbert Simon University Professor Emeritus of Human-computer Interaction at the Human-Computer Interaction Institute at Carnegie Mellon University.

== Background ==
Robert Kraut graduated Phi Beta Kappa from Lehigh University in 1968 and received his Ph.D. in social psychology from Yale University in 1973. He joined the sociology faculty at the University of Pennsylvania in 1972 and joined the psychology and sociology departments at Cornell University in 1974.

In 1980, Kraut joined Bell Labs as a visiting scientist and departed Cornell in 1981 to become a full-time scientist working in Bell's Interface Planning group. Following the 1984 Bell System divestiture, he worked in the Behavioral Science research group at Bell Communications Research (Bellcore) and later became the director of the Interpersonal Communication research. During his tenure at Bell, Kraut was also a visiting lecturer and fellow at Princeton University. In 1993, Kraut left Bellcore and accepted a full-time faculty appointment at Carnegie Mellon University as a professor of social psychology and human computer interaction. Kraut was named the Herbert A. Simon Professor of Human-computer Interaction in 2000, became an emeritus professor in 2018, and appointed University Professor in 2022.

He was elected to the CHI Academy in 2003 and received its lifetime achievement award for research in 2016. He was board member of the Computer Science and Telecommunications Board of the US National Academy of Sciences and is a fellow of the American Psychological Society and of the Association for Computing Machinery.

== Research ==
Kraut's research focuses on five areas: online communities, everyday use of the Internet, technology and conversation, collaboration in small work groups, and computers in organizations. He has published more than 200 articles, papers and books. He first examines the challenges that individuals, groups, and organizations face when performing social tasks. Working with computer scientists and engineers to create and determine the usefulness of the new technology, he believes his findings can lead to the design of new technology to meet some of these challenges.

=== Online Communities ===
Some of his work examines factors influencing the success of online communities and ways to apply psychology theory to their design. The results of much of this research are summarized in the book, Building Successful Online Communities: Evidence-Based Social Design. The underlying research includes academic studies about Wikipedia, for example, research with Aniket Kittur on the condition that lead to better quality in Wikipedia articles and with Moira Burke in predicting successful candidates for Wikipedia administrators.

Kraut focuses on determining what motivates people to commit and contribute to online communities and designing these communities to be more successful. He also works with Aniket Kittur to understand coordination in online communities, with John Levine to understand socialization between newcomers and these communities, and with Laura Dabbish and Tom Postmes to design for commitment purposes.

=== Everyday use of the Internet ===
Kraut investigates how people use the Internet daily and the effects it is having on them and their social relationships. In 1995, Kraut and Sara Kiesler documented individuals and families’ usage with electronic communication and information services and the integration of and the impact these services are having on their social and psychological well-being.

With Jonathon Cummings and Irina Shklovski, Kraut has looked into how people who are moving around to different locations use the Internet to build and maintain social connections. Much of his work focuses on the impact of online communication with other people and chatbots influences people's mental well-being. He worked with Moira Burke and examined how various uses of Facebook influence users’ social capital, health, and psychological well-being.

=== Technology and conversation ===
Since 1979, Kraut has been examining how pairs coordinate their conversation because it has been shown that working in the same location enhances collaboration, which improves communication efficiency. His research with Susan R. Fussell, Susan Brennan, and Darren Gergle looked into how a shared visual space influences collaboration, how the usefulness of visual information interacts with tasks, and identify ways to build communication systems for remote collaborative work.

=== Managing Attention ===
Economic markets are the social institution for fairly allocating scarce resources. In this area of research, Kraut wants to find out how to align the intuition that markets for attention with those who are sending and receiving the information. He also wants to be able to test the markets. Kraut has been working with Jim Morris, Shyam Sunder, and Rahul Telang on this research. They acknowledged that groups can only collaborate effectively if they are communicating spontaneously and informally. However, interruptions may cause them to be less productive. Laura Dabbish and Kraut are working towards finding ways to manage interruptions more efficiently in order to decrease disruption.

In 1979, Dr. Kraut and his Cornell psychology colleague Robert E. Johnston published an article studying smiling behavior among bowlers, hockey fans, and pedestrians. Their findings suggested that smiling emerges in response to social motivations rather than emotional experience and serves an important role in nonverbal communication. Although it substantiated theories in the emerging field of evolutionary psychology, Wisconsin Senator William Proxmire identified this federally sponsored research as an instance of wasteful government spending and highlighted it in March 1980 with a "Golden Fleece Award".

=== Coordination in groups ===
Performing the same task as a group is inherently different than individuals doing so because coordination is needed when working with others. Working with Susan Fussell, Javier Lerch, and Alberto Espinosa, Kraut has been observing coordination in groups in laboratory and field settings as well as in a variety of groups, including research collaborations, managerial teams, military crews at NORAD, pick up groups in World of Warcraft, and software development teams. They found that one effective method teams use to coordinate is developing mental models of one another, their goals, the tasks that need to be done, and their environment. Such models improve coordination with less communication.

== Curriculum ==
Outside of his research, Kraut taught undergraduate, masters, and PhD courses at Carnegie Mellon University. As an emeritus professor, he no longer does classroom teaching, although he still mentors students and post-docs on research. Previous courses included the following: Communication in Groups and Organizations, Computer Supported Cooperative Work: Designing Online Communities, Social Science Perspectives in HCI, HCI Process and Theory, and HCI Undergraduate Project Course.

His objective in Communication in Groups and Organizations was to help students learn about the communication challenges that come with group work and how to effectively resolved them. Students can better understand successful communication by applying data gathering and research principles in case studies and group exercises. His class Computer Supported Cooperative Work: Designing Online Communities is intended to provide knowledge for his students to distinguish between effective and ineffective online communities and the skills to design effective ones. Social Science Perspectives in HCI was a seminar-style course that covers not only the history of human-computer interaction, but also innovative findings in information systems. Through readings, he discusses different approaches in research and addresses the challenges that researchers face in this field of study. HCI Process and Theory and the HCI Undergraduate Project Course were research-based classes where Kraut engaged in semester-long projects with a group of students.

== Publications ==
Dr. Kraut has co-authored a number of books relating to the intersection of technology and the social sciences (often under the Human-Computer Interaction umbrella) throughout his career.

=== Books ===
- Hartmann, Heidi I.; Kraut, R. E.; Tilly, Louise A. (1986). Computer Chips and Paper Clips: Technology and Women's Employment. Washington, DC: National Academy Press. ISBN 0-585-26155-5.
- Kraut, Robert E., ed. (1987). Technology and The Transformation of White-Collar Work. Hillsdale, NJ: Lawrence Erlbaum Associates. ISBN 0-89859-633-5.
- Galegher, J.; Kraut, R. E.; Egido, C., eds. (1990). Intellectual Teamwork: Social and Technological Bases for Cooperative Work. Hillsdale, NJ: Lawrence Erlbaum Associates. ISBN 0-8058-0534-6.
- Turner, J.; Kraut, R. E., eds. (1992). Sharing Perspectives: Proceedings of the Conference on Computer-Supported Cooperative Work. New York: Association for Computing Machinery. ISBN 0-89791-542-9.
- Committee on Telecommuting and Technology (1994). Research Recommendations to Facilitate Distributed Work. Washington, DC: National Academy Press. ISBN 0-309-05185-1.
- Kraut, Robert E.; Resnick, Paul (2012). Building successful online communities: Evidence-based social design. Cambridge, MA: MIT Press. ISBN 978-0-262-01657-5.

Dr. Kraut’s most recent book, Building Successful Online Communities is a collaboration with Dr. Paul Resnick at the University of Michigan. The book draws on theory and empirical research to give a broad understanding of what causes online communities to succeed or fail. Kraut and Resnick segment the book into a variety of design claims focused on how to improve the design of online communities. These claims are supported by evidence from academic research in the social sciences, namely psychology and economics.
A major theme of Building Successful Online Communities centers on what it means to be a successful online community. Some common themes of success involve the ability to attract newcomers, encourage commitment and contribution, and regulate group member behavior. Specifically, Kraut and Resnick’s argue “to be successful, online communities need the people who participate in them to contribute the resources on which the group's existence is built.”

=== Highly cited articles ===
- Kraut, Robert E.; Johnston, Robert E. (September 1979). "Social and emotional messages of smiling: An ethological approach". Journal of Personality and Social Psychology. 37 (9): 1539–1553. doi:10.1037/0022-3514.37.9.1539. S2CID 18152366.
- Kraut, Robert E.; Fish, Robert S.; Root, Robert W.; Chalfonte, Barbara L.; Oskamp, I. S. (1990). "Informal communication in organizations: Form, function, and technology". In Oskamp, S.; Spacapan, S. (eds.). Human reactions to technology: Claremont symposium on applied social psychology.
- Fish, Robert S.; Kraut, Robert E.; Root, Robert W.; Rice, Ronald E. (January 1993). "Video as a technology for informal communication". Communications of the ACM. 36 (1): 48–61. doi:10.1145/151233.151237. S2CID 15953180.
- Kraut, Robert E.; Streeter, Lynn A. (March 1995). "Coordination in software development". Communications of the ACM. 38 (3): 69–81. doi:10.1145/203330.203345. S2CID 18155214.
- Kraut, Robert E.; Rice, Ronald E.; Cool, Colleen; Fish, Robert S. (1998). "Varieties of Social Influence: The Role of Utility and Norms in the Success of a New Communication Medium". Organization Science. 9 (4): 437–453. doi:10.1287/orsc.9.4.437. JSTOR 2640271.
- Kraut, Robert; Olson, Judith; Banaji, Mahzarin; Bruckman, Amy; Cohen, Jeffrey; Couper, Mick (2004). "Psychological Research Online: Report of Board of Scientific Affairs' Advisory Group" (PDF). American Psychologist. 59 (2). American Psychological Association: 105–117. doi:10.1037/0003-066X.59.2.105. PMID 14992637.
- Kraut, Robert; Patterson, Michael; Lundmark, Vicki; Kiesler, Sara; Mukophadhyay, Tridas; Scherlis, William (1998). "Internet paradox: A social technology that reduces social involvement and psychological well-being?". American Psychologist. 53 (9): 1017–1031. Bibcode:1998AmPsy..53.1017K. doi:10.1037/0003-066X.53.9.1017. PMID 9841579.
- Burke, Moira; Kraut, Robert; Marlow, Cameron (2011). Social capital on Facebook: Differentiating uses and users. SIGCHI conference on human factors in computing systems. Association for Computing Machinery. pp. 571–580. doi:10.1145/1978942.1979023.

=== Other publications ===
- Kraut wrote Re-engineering Social Encounters, an essay reflecting back to his research on social psychology. He explained how he felt in an environment filled with computer scientists and engineers, and what he learned as a result of the challenges he faced.
- Kraut was featured in an article called, “Inventing the Future”. It was published in the School of Computer Science’s (cite 5) alumni magazine at Carnegie Mellon University. It delved into his accomplishments and his contributions in founding the Human-Computer Interaction Institute.
