= Schorer =

Schorer is a surname. Notable people with the surname include:

- Cornelia Schorer (1863–1939), German physician
- Mark Schorer (1908–1977), American writer and scholar
- Suki Schorer, American ballet dancer, ballet mistress, teacher, and writer

== See also ==
- Schober
- Schorr
