= Schober =

Schober, a German term for a small barn or a haystack, is common as an occupational surname, metonymic for a farmer, and as a name for haystack-shaped mountains.

== People named Schober ==
- Aurelia Frances Schober (1906–1994), mother of the poet Sylvia Plath
- Barbara Schober (born 1958), German visual artist
- Bernadette Schober (born 1984), Austrian racing cyclist
- Franz von Schober (1796–1882), Austrian poet, librettist, lithographer, and actor
- Johann Schober (1874–1932), three-time Chancellor of Austria
- John C. Schober (born 1961), American politician and lawyer
- Mathias Schober (born 1976), German football goalkeeper
- Michael Schober (born 1964), American psychologist
- Olga Schoberová (born 1943), Czech actress
- Paul Schober (1865–1943), German physician who developed Schober's test
- Rita Schober (1918–2012), German scholar of Romance studies and literature who championed Emile Zola and organised translations of his books.
- Sonja Schöber (born 1985), German swimmer
- William Schober (born 1956), Australian figure skater
- Wolfgang Schober (born 1989), Austrian football goalkeeper

== Mountains ==
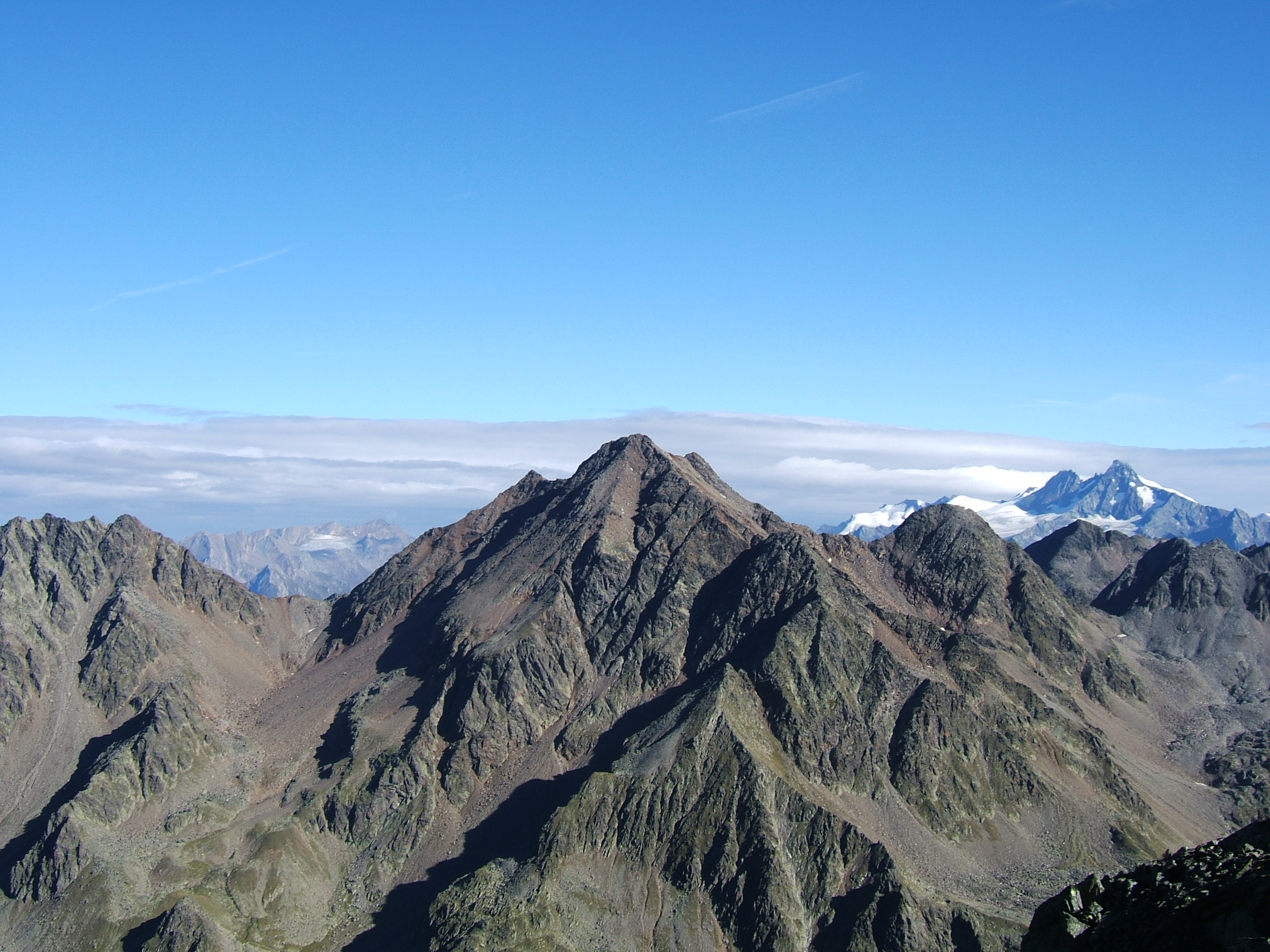
The Hochschober

There are about 20 mountains, minor summits, and hills named "(great/high) haystack" in Austria alone. Among these are:

- The Hochschober (3,242 m), after which the Schober Group has been named.
- Schober (2,967 m) in the Ankogel Group in Carinthia
- Schober (1,328 m) on the border of Upper Austria and Salzburg
- The Schober Pass (849 m) in the Niedere Tauern in Styria

== Other ==
- 2871 Schober, an asteroid
