= Grabher =

Grabher is a surname of German-language origin. The 2010 United States census found 182 people with the surname Grabher, making it the 99,378th-most-common name in the country. This represented an increase from 158 (104,819th-most-common) in the 2000 Census.

== People ==
- Gerd Grabher (born 1953) Austrian football referee
- Gernot Grabher (born 1960), Austrian economic geographer
- Julia Grabher (born 1996), Austrian tennis player
- Pius Grabher (born 1993), Austrian footballer
- Maria Grabher-Meyer (1898–1970), Liechtensteiner poet and short story writer
