= Jean E. Fox Tree =

American psychologist

Jean E. Fox Tree is a professor in the Department of Psychology at the University of California, Santa Cruz. Fox Tree studies collateral signals that people use in spontaneous speech, such as fillers (e.g. ‘you know’), prosodic information (e.g. pauses between words, the melody of a sentence), fillers (e.g. ‘uh’ and ‘um’), and speech disfluencies. Fox Tree showed that collateral signals are essential to successful communication in everyday situations and are beneficial to listeners.

== Early life and education ==
Fox Tree received her bachelor's degree from Harvard University, her M.Sc from the University of Edinburgh and her Ph.D. from Stanford University.

== Research ==
Fox Tree studied the use of ‘oh’ in several experiments. They found that ‘oh’ can be used by speakers to signal to that the information they are providing is not connected to the information that just preceded it. That is, while an utterance that follows another is usually connected to the one that preceded it, ‘oh’ can be used to signal that the utterance is not connected to the one that directly before it, but rather to something further back (for example “I went to the market and bought some fruit. I got apples, pears, grapes, and oranges. It was really crowded there today. Oh, and kiwis.”) (1999).

Fox Tree published two articles with Herbert H. Clark. In one paper, Clark and Fox Tree (2002) argued that 'uh' and 'um' are conventional English words that speakers use in distinct ways. While 'uh' is used to signal a short delay, 'um' is used to signal a longer delay in speaking. Delays are interpreted as meaning different things, such as searching for a word, thinking of the next word to say, or holding or ceding the floor in speaking. Fox Tree demonstrated online and offline effects of fillers in 2001 and 2002. In an earlier study, Fox Tree and Clark (1997) argued that the pronunciation of the word ‘the’ varies from the usual ‘thuh’ (rhyming with first syllable of ‘about’) to ‘thee’ (rhyming with ‘bee’) to signal difficulties in speech production.

Other topics that Fox Tree has researched include the use of expressions such as ‘you know’ and ‘I mean’, the effects of false starts and repetitions in the comprehension of spontaneous speech, the use of prosody in syntactic disambiguation, the interpretation of pauses in spontaneous speaking, and the recognition of verbal irony in spontaneous speech.

Fox Tree's work contributes both theory and data to many disciplines, such as computer technology and artificial intelligence (how machines can recognize and reproduce collateral signals), psychology (the role that collateral signals have in speech production and recognition), sociology (how various groups use collateral signals), linguistics (the structure and the function of collateral signals), and communication/media studies (the effect that the frequent editing of collateral signals from spontaneous radio talk might have on meaning).
