= Susan Brennan =

American cognitive scientist

Susan E. Brennan
- Occupation: Distinguished Professor

Academic background
- Education: Stanford University (PhD) Massachusetts Institute of Technology (MS) Cornell University (BA)

Academic work
- Discipline: Cognitive Science, Psychology, Linguistics, Computer Science
- Sub-discipline: Psychology of Language
- Institutions: Stony Brook University

Susan Elise Brennan is a cognitive scientist known for her research on human communication within the multiple lenses of linguistics, psychology, and computer science. She holds the positions of Distinguished Professor and Director of Graduate Studies in Stony Brook University.

Brennan is a member of the American Association for the Advancement of Science (AAAS). In 2003, she won the State University of New York (SUNY) Chancellors Research Recognition Award and in 2023, she was appointed Distinguished Professor by the SUNY Board of Trustees.

== Biography ==
Brennan received her B.A. degree in Anthropology at Cornell University. She continued her education at the Massachusetts Institute of Technology (MIT) where she worked under the supervision of Nicholas Negroponte in the MIT Department of Architecture and the Architecture Machine Group. Brennan's master's thesis on computer generation of caricatures, published in 1982, launched the beginning of her accomplished career in academia. Her thesis was groundbreaking in using an innovative computer program to design faces with exaggerated features. This contributed to the evolution of the ability of computers to recognize facial features, and through a cognitive science lens, provided insight into the way humans process and perceive facial features.

Brennan completed her Ph.D. degree in Psychology in 1990 at Stanford University, with a specialization in psycholinguistics and cognitive science. Under advisor Herb Clark, Brennan wrote her doctoral thesis entitled "Seeking and providing evidence for mutual understanding" (1990). Her thesis expanded on Clark's previous work on grounding in conversation by creating and testing a method to gather evidence of understanding in conversation.

Brennan served as Program Director for the National Science Foundation (NSF) Graduate Research Fellowship Program from 2015-2018. In 2021, Brennan along with four of her colleagues at Stony Brook University were awarded a cumulative $3 million NSF grant to support graduate student research training in data science and artificial intelligence (AI). Their project was featured on the NSF website for its efforts aimed at detecting and combating biases in AI.

== Research ==
Brennan's research program examines communication in varied contexts and interactive processes of human conversation. While some linguistic research focuses on either the listener or speaker in a conversation, Brennan's experimental designs allows for both perspectives to be analyzed. For instance, her research questions explore how an individual may be processing a conversation as both listener and speaker, e.g., while speaking, whether they engage in gestures or body language, and while listening, whether they prepare for their response following the utterance.

In 1995, Brennan published work on centering attention in discourse. She explored the linguistic devices used by speakers to draw attention to "entities" of their conversation by controlling audio-visual stimuli in and out of focus. The results of this study found that speakers use linguistic devices to draw the listeners' attention to the subject of their choice.

In 2006, Brennan's work on conversational meaning led her to analyze shared gazes. Participants in this study wore eyetrackers while completing tasks either alone or collaborating utilizing verbal discussion, looking or gazing without discussion, or a combination of both. Brennan and her team were looking at how quickly and accurately the task was completed. The study is an important contribution to the field because the "shared-gaze" condition resulted in faster, more efficient task completion compared to the conditions including dialogue.

== Representative publications ==
- Brennan, S. E. (1985). Caricature generator: the dynamic exaggeration of faces by computer. Leonardo, 18(3), 170-178.
- Brennan, S. E. (1995). Centering attention in discourse. Language and Cognitive processes, 10(2), 137-167. https://doi.org/10.1080/01690969508407091
- Brennan, S. E., & Clark, H. H. (1996). Conceptual pacts and lexical choice in conversation. Journal of Experimental Psychology: Learning, Memory, and Cognition, 22(6), 1482–1493. https://doi.org/10.1037/0278-7393.22.6.1482
- Brennan, S. E., Friedman, M. W., & Pollard, C. J. (1987). A centering approach to pronouns. In Proceedings of the 25th Annual Meeting of the Association for Computational Linguistics (pp. 155–162). Stanford.
- Clark, H. H., & Brennan, S. E. (1991). Grounding in communication. In L. B. Resnick, J. M. Levine, & S. D. Teasley (Eds.), Perspectives on socially shared cognition (pp. 127–149). American Psychological Association.
