= Sara Kiesler =

American social psychologist and computer scientist

Dr. Sara Kiesler
- Education: Simmons College(Bachelors); Stanford University (MA); Ohio State University (Ph.D.)
- Awards: CHI Lifetime Achievement Award
- Scientific career
- Fields: Social psychology, human-computer interaction
- Workplaces: Carnegie Mellon University

Sara Beth (Greene) Kiesler is the Hillman Professor Emerita of Computer Science and Human Computer Interaction in the Human-Computer Interaction Institute at Carnegie Mellon University. She is also a program director in the Directorate for Social, Behavioral & Economic Sciences at the US National Science Foundation, where her responsibilities include programs on Secure and Trustworthy Cyberspace, The Future of Work at the Human-Technology Frontier, Smart and Connected Communities, and Securing American Infrastructure. She received an M.A. degree in psychology from Stanford in 1963, and a Ph.D., also in psychology, from Ohio State University in 1965.

== Areas of Research ==
Kiesler has broad interests in the design and social impact of computing and online behavior ranging from computer-mediated communication and computer-supported cooperative work to human-robot interaction and social media. In her early studies with Lee Sproull and her colleagues and students, she examined how computer networking changed group dynamics and social interaction. Their influential 1992 book, Connections described the indirect, secondary effects of using email in organizations. Through field observations and experiments they demonstrated the influence of computer-mediated communication phenomena such as status equalization, personal connections and flaming. Research with Robert E. Kraut from the 1990s showed that everyday use of the Internet increased users' depression and decreased their social connections. Later research showed that the psychological consequences of Internet use depend fundamentally on how it is used: communication with friends and family online has positive psychological consequences, while communication with strangers has negative effects. Her ongoing projects include studies of collaboration and virtual organization in science, of collaborative analysis online, of the cognitive and social aspects of human-robot and digital agent interaction, and of how people perceive and try to protect their privacy online. Her publications can be found on her website and in Google Scholar.

== Awards and honors list ==
- Elected to the CHI Academy, 2002
- CHI Lifetime Achievement Award, the most prestigious award by SIGCHI, 2009
- Association for Computing Machinery (ACM) Fellow, 2010
- Allen Newell Award for Research Excellence, 2013
- International Communication Association Williams Prize, 2015
- InGROUP McGrath Lifetime Award, 2016
- Elected to American Academy of Arts and Sciences, 2018
- Human Robot Interaction Lifetime Service Award, 2018
- Elected a member of the National Academy of Engineering (2019) for leadership, technical innovation, and identification of social trends with the adoption of computers and robots in work and society

She regularly serves on the ACM SIGCHI, CSCW, and HRI conference program committees. She is a past board member of the Computer Science and Telecommunications Board of the National Academy of Sciences, and past Editor of the Journal of Human Robot Interaction. She is a fellow of the American Psychological Association and of the Association for Computing Machinery, and a founding member of the American Psychological Society. She also was a long-time director of the nonprofit research company, American Institutes for Research.
