= Darren Gergle =

American academic

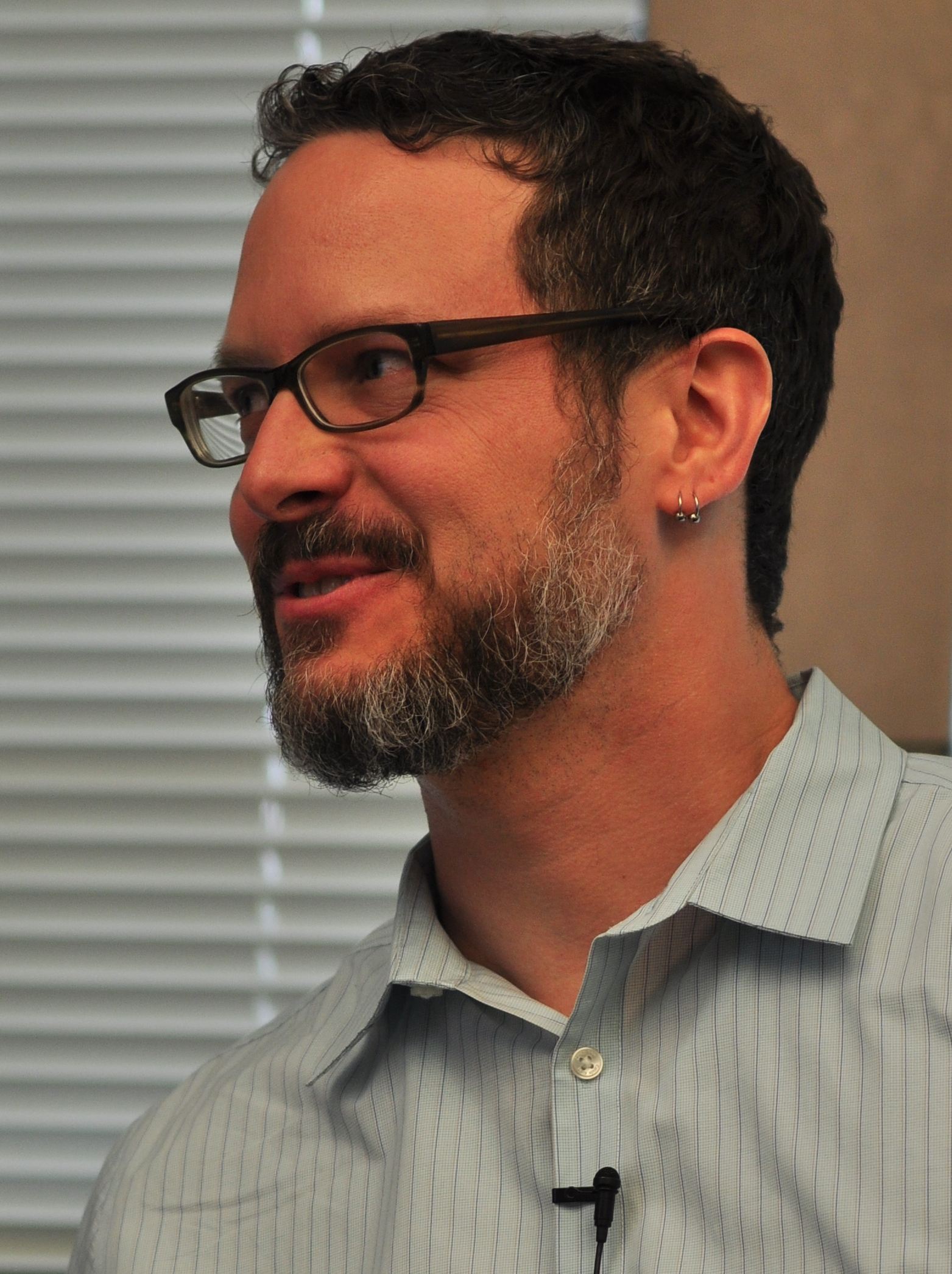
- Born: December 2, 1972 (age 53)
- Citizenship: United States
- Education: University of Michigan (B.F.A., B.A. 1995); University of Michigan (M.S.I., 2001); Carnegie Mellon University (Ph.D., 2006)
- Scientific career
- Fields: Human-Computer Interaction, Social computing
- Workplaces: Northwestern University (2006– )
- Doctoral advisor: Robert E. Kraut

Darren Robert Gergle (born 2 December 1972) is an American professor in communication studies and computer science (by courtesy) at Northwestern University. He currently holds the AT&T Research Professorship in Communication at Northwestern University, where he directs the Collaborative Technology Lab (CollabLab). The locus of his research centers on human–computer interaction and social computing. He focuses on the application of cognitive and social psychological theories to the design, development and evaluation of groundbreaking communication technologies. His work is supported through grants from the National Institute of Mental Health, National Science Foundation, Google, Microsoft Research and Facebook.

== Early life and education ==
Gergle was born on December 2, 1972, to parents Robert and Barbara Gergle. He is the youngest of three children. He is married to Tracy Lynn Zawaski. He graduated from the University of Michigan in December, 1995 with a Bachelor of Arts in psychology and a Bachelor of Fine Arts in printmaking and sculpture. Six years later he attained his Master of Science in information (human–computer interaction). In 2006, he achieved his Doctor of Philosophy in human–computer interaction from the School of Computer Science at Carnegie Mellon University.Northwestern University, Communication Studies Department, hired him as an assistant professor in 2006, where he lectured for ten years. In 2015, he was appointed professor of the same university, where he currently lectures technology and human interaction; community building software; applied research methods for media and technology and Python for social scientists. He is also currently the director of the CollabLab, a research facility where researchers explore how humans and computers interact in technologically-mediated environments.

== Research ==
Gergle’s research is primarily based upon a multi-dimensional investigation of variable attributes of Human Computer Interaction (HCI). This encompasses visual information processing, social information processing, and collaborations. In his doctoral dissertation, he investigated the impact that shared visual information has on task-oriented collaboration. These findings built the foundation for further research. New technologies can be designed with in depth understanding of “the ways in which shared visual information influences collaborative performance”. Usability for the Web: Designing Web Sites That Work is a book which Gergle co-authored. He applied principles of design theory and visual information processing to guide web designers in using a systematic website design model where the user’s needs are the focal point.

In 2003, he investigated the impact of the size of displays on comprehension and spatial tasks. This ignited further research. In 2004, investigations into whether physically large displays can improve path integration in 3D virtual navigation tasks were conducted. He explored collaborative systems further, by examining the use of “dyadic mobile eye tracking to study collaborative reference”.

His research found “systematic differences in linguistic and visual coordination between pairs of mobile and seated participants”. The results show “measurable interactions between referential form, gaze, and spatial context”, These can be used to implement “the development of more natural collaborative user interfaces”.

One of his investigations surrounds the architecture of Wikipedia. He discovered that different languages contain different types of information from similar topics where the language barrier prevents access and collaboration of information and ideas. Wikipedia has a discrepancy known as the “silo effect”. “The Silo Effect in business refers to the lack of communication and cross-departmental support often found in large companies” He sought to remedy this architectural flaw by presenting a solution called Omnipedia.

== Published works ==
- Brinck, T., Gergle, D., & Wood, S. (2003). Usability for the Web: Designing Web Sites that Work. Morgan Kaufmann Publishers.
