= Gina Neff =

American sociologist

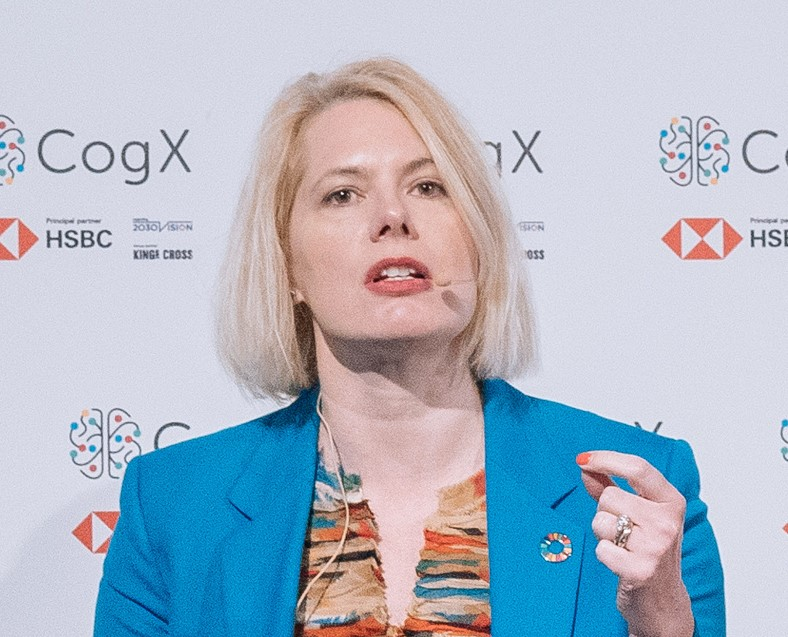
- Neff in 2019
- Born: January 23, 1971 (age 55); Campton, Kentucky, US
- Occupations: Author; Executive Director at University of Cambridge
- Spouse: Philip N. Howard
- Awards: Best Book award from American Sociological Association; Fellow at the Institute for Advanced Study in Budapest

Academic background
- Education: Columbia University (Ph.D., 2004); Graduate Center, CUNY (MPhil, 2001); Columbia College (B.A., 1993)
- Doctoral advisor: David C. Stark

Academic work
- Discipline: Social Science
- Website: www.ginaneff.com

Gina Neff is the executive director of the Minderoo Centre for Technology and Democracy at the University of Cambridge. Neff was previously Professor of Technology & Society at the Oxford Internet Institute and the Department of Sociology at the University of Oxford. Neff is an organizational sociologist whose research explores the social and organizational impact of new communication technologies, with a focus on innovation, the digital transformation of industries, and how new technologies impact work.

== Education ==
Neff holds a PhD in sociology from Columbia University, where she remains an external faculty affiliate of the Center on Organizational Innovation. She has held appointments at Princeton University, New York University, Stanford University, UC San Diego and UC Los Angeles. Previously she was assistant professor at University of California, San Diego, Associate Professor at the University of Washington, and associate professor at the School of Public Policy at Central European University. She was also a faculty member at the Center for Media, Data and Society. She completed her high school education at the Armand Hammer United World College of the American West.

== Books ==
Self-Tracking, explores what happens when people turn their everyday experiences into data, examining the habits and usage of self-tracking. The book explores the cultural phenomenon of health-related self-tracking. Neff and her co-author Dawn Nafus explore how people record, analyse and reflect on this data, looking at the tools they use and the communities they become part of. They consider self-tracking to be a social and cultural phenomenon, describing not only the use of data as a kind of mirror of the self but also how this enables people to connect to and learn from others. It was awarded Co-Winner, American Sociological Association Section on Communication and Information Technologies (CITASA) 2013 Book Award.

Venture Labor: Work and the Burden of Risk in Innovative Industries, looks at Silicon Alley in the 1990s and explores why pioneering internet companies chose to invest in start-up ventures. Neff attributes this to a broader shift in society with the shift of economic risk from collective responsibility to individual responsibility. She argues that understanding ‘venture labour’ is important to encourage innovation and create sustainable work environments. The book focuses on the norms, values, attitudes, and individual experiences related to the system-wide changes resulting from the expanding use of the Internet in the late 20th century. It won the Best Book Award from the American Sociological Association's Section on Communication and Information Technologies in 2013.

Surviving the New Economy explores how employees of technology industries address their concerns about instability in the workplace via both traditional collective bargaining and through innovative action. Neff and co-authors John Anman and Tris Carpenter draw upon case studies from the United States and abroad to examine how highly skilled workers are surviving in a global economy in which the rules have changed and how they are reshaping their workplaces in the process.

== Research ==
At the Oxford Internet Institute, Neff was the leader of a multinational comparative research project that studies the effects of the adoption of Artificial Intelligence across various industries. This project encompasses two major studies looking at the future of work in data-rich environments: The “Al & Data Diversity” project aims to advance public understanding of data diversity and the everyday decisions around technological innovations and AI and the “Data Work: Collaboration, Sense Making and the Possible Futures For Work” project explores the effects of new types of data on workplace practices.

== Teaching ==
Neff taught the “Social Dynamics of the Internet” course, a compulsory course for Master of Science and Doctor of Philosophy students studying at the Oxford Internet Institute. The course is designed to curate a common basis of understanding in order to debate the internet and to create a shared understanding of the social implications of the internet. It draws upon material from several social science disciplines including communication studies, sociology, anthropology, political science and ethics.
