= Laura Dabbish =

American computer scientist

Laura A. Dabbish is an American computer scientist who works at Carnegie Mellon University as a professor in the Human-Computer Interaction Institute and the H. John Heinz III College of Public Policy, Information Systems, and Management. She describes her research on the sociology and psychology of human–computer interaction as concerning "the social effects of digital transparency". She is known for her research on games with a purpose, on algorithmic management, and on fairness, recognition, and personal identity in computer-supported cooperative work.

== Education ==
Dabbish was an undergraduate at the University of Southern California, where she majored in computer science and psychology. She has a master's degree and Ph.D. in human–computer interaction from Carnegie Mellon University, completed in 2006. Her doctoral dissertation, Coordinating Initiation and Response in Computer-Mediated Communication, was supervised by social psychologist Robert E. Kraut.

== Recognition ==
Dabbish was named to the CHI Academy in 2026.

== Personal life ==
Dabbish married Luis von Ahn, a software developer and entrepreneur who was also a student and professor at Carnegie Mellon University. They are no longer married, and von Ahn subsequently remarried.
