= Center on Organizational Innovation =

Research center at Columbia University

Coordinates: 40.807792°N 73.959671°W

The Center on Organizational Innovation (COI) is a research center at Columbia University's Institute for Social and Economic Research and Policy. The center, established in 2000 and directed by sociologist David Stark, promotes research in the areas of organizational studies, science and technology studies and economic sociology, with an emphasis on innovation and reflexivity.
