= Moira Burke =

American computer scientist

Moira Burke is an American computer scientist working in the field of human-computer interaction. She currently works as a data scientist for Facebook.

== Education ==
Burke received her bachelor's degree from the University of Oregon in 2001 and her PhD from Carnegie Mellon University in 2011 under the supervision of Robert E. Kraut.

== Research ==
While at Carnegie Mellon, Burke published a study which found that talking to close friends on Facebook was associated with improved well-being. In 2013, Burke and Kraut published a study which found that Facebook users who contacted close friends about job opportunities were more likely to find employment than were those who contacted acquaintances. In 2014, Burke and Kraut published a study which found that interaction with other users on Facebook increases closeness, regardless of how much effort this interaction takes. In 2020, Burke with two other Facebook researchers published a study examining how use of social media contributed to social comparison bias. The study found that teens experienced more social comparison than adults.
