= Rahul Telang =

American professor and management scientist

- Education: Ph.D. in Information Systems; Bachelor of Engineering
- Alma mater: Carnegie Mellon University; Birla Institute of Technology and Science (BITS, Pilani)

Rahul Telang is an Information Systems and Management professor at Carnegie Mellon University's Heinz College of Information Systems and Public Policy. He is known for his book Streaming, Sharing, Stealing, which he co-authored with Michael D. Smith.

His scholarly work has been published in Management Science, Marketing Science, Information Systems Research, MIS Quarterly, and the Journal of Marketing Research, and he serves on the editorial boards of these journals.

His research focuses on the economic and policy implications of digital technologies, particularly in the media, entertainment, cybersecurity, and privacy sectors.

== Education and career ==
Telang earned his Ph.D. in Information Systems from Carnegie Mellon University.

He has been a faculty member at the Heinz College of Carnegie Mellon University since 2002, primarily teaching in the School of Information Systems and Management. He also holds a courtesy appointment at the Tepper School of Business.

Before pursuing his PhD, he completed his Bachelor of Engineering from the Birla Institute of Technology and Science (BITS, Pilani), India.

== Research ==
Rahul has made contributions to the media industry, with a focus on music and film. In the early 2000s, when he started his career, Napster and then BitTorrent-based protocols made music and movie infringement commonplace. He conducted a series of research on the role of piracy in demand, supply, innovation, and the role of copyrights and policymaking. He and his colleague, Michael Smith, established a research center, Initiative for Digital Entertainment Analytics (IDEA). The center examines various economic and policy issues surrounding the entertainment industry. In 2016, he wrote a book, “Streaming Sharing Stealing: Big Data and the Future of Entertainment,” with his colleague, Michael Smith.

His other area of research is the economics of Information Security. In the early 2000s, the lack of software security became a significant concern as numerous data breaches became common due to buggy products. He wrote a series of papers on what makes software unique, which enables firms to sell such products successfully in the market. His work outlines the impact of policymaking on improving software security and mitigating consumer losses. He has won awards and is the recipient of grants, including the NSF Career Award, the Alfred Sloan Foundation, and a grant from the NSA.

In 2025, Telang co-authored a study examining the role of generative AI systems in reproducing copyrighted material, which found that outputs frequently included content resembling copyrighted characters and other protected works even without explicit prompting for them.

He was the chair of the PhD program from 2014 until 2019, when he suffered a serious injury (TBI) when he fell 20 feet from his attic.

== Selected publications ==
- Telang, Rahul; Mani, Deepa; Agarwal, Saharsh (2023). "The Impact of Ride-Hailing Services on Congestion: Evidence from Indian Cities". Manufacturing & Service Operations Management. 25 (3): 862–883. doi:10.1287/msom.2022.1158. ISSN 1523-4614.
- Telang, Rahul; Cho, Daegon; Hwang, Youngdeok; Sim, Jaeung (2022). "Frontiers: Virus Shook the Streaming Star: Estimating the COVID-19 Impact on Music Consumption". Marketing Science. 41 (1): 19–32. doi:10.1287/mksc.2021.1321. ISSN 0732-2399.
- Telang, Rahul; Haviland, Amelia M.; Venkat, Arvind; Ladhania, Rahul; Pines, Jesse M. (2019-05-27). "The Effect of Medicaid Expansion on the Nature of New Enrollees' Emergency Department Use". Medical Care Research and Review. 78 (1): 24–35. doi:10.1177/1077558719848270. ISSN 1077-5587. PMID 31132912.
- Telang, Rahul; Li, Hui; Aziz, Arsalan (2023). "The Consequences of Rating Inflation on Platforms: Evidence from a Quasi-Experiment". Information Systems Research. 34 (2): 590–608. doi:10.1287/isre.2022.1134. ISSN 1047-7047.
- Telang, Rahul; Waldfogel, Joel (2018). "Piracy and new product creation: A Bollywood story". Information Economics and Policy. 43: 1–11. doi:10.1016/j.infoecopol.2018.03.002. ISSN 0167-6245.
- Telang, Rahul; Ferreira, Pedro; De Matos, Miguel Godinho (2019-04-03). "Effect of Friends' Churn on Consumer Behavior in Mobile Networks". Journal of Management Information Systems. 36 (2): 355–390. doi:10.1080/07421222.2019.1598683. hdl:10400.14/32821. ISSN 0742-1222.
- Telang, Rahul (2014–2015). "A Privacy and Security Policy Infrastructure for Big Data". I/S: A Journal of Law and Policy for the Information Society. 10: 783.
- Telang, Rahul (2020). "Did State Opening affect the COVID Incidences in the US?". SSRN Electronic Journal. doi:10.2139/ssrn.3617013. ISSN 1556-5068. SSRN 3617013.
- Telang, Rahul-Carnegie Mellon University (2004). "An Empirical Analysis of Cellular Voice and Data services". NET Institute Working Papers Series.
