= Barbara Schober =

German multi-media artist

- Education: State Academy of Fine Arts Stuttgart
- Occupation: Visual artist
- Website: www.barbaraschober.de

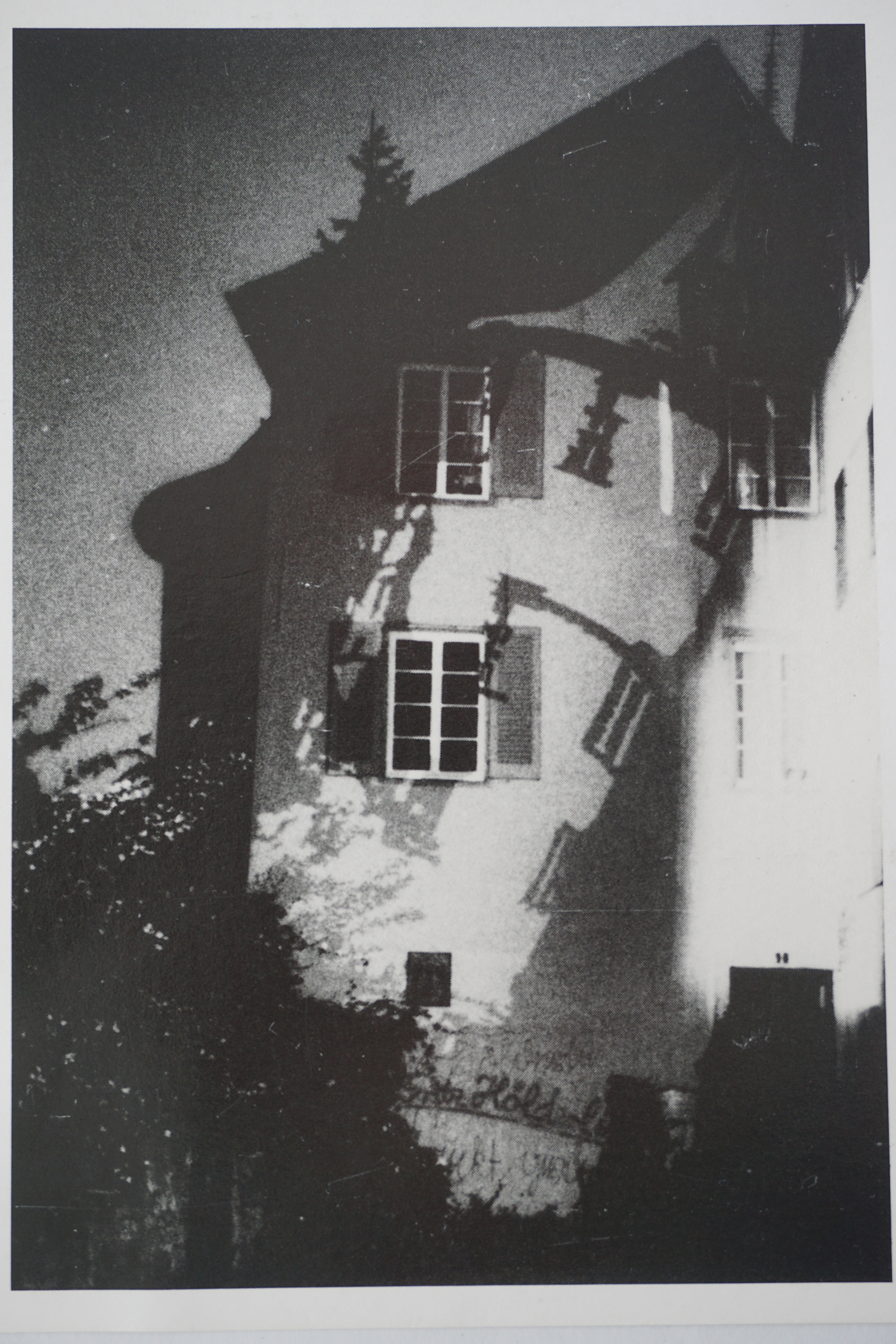
„Verrücken“ – Hölderlinturm, sculpture competition, Tübingen 1991, postcard by Cultural Office Tübingen, Image: Chris Schaal

Barbara Schober is a German visual artist. Her work covers a broad range of various media in which the term "Internet Awareness" plays an important role. With ancient techniques and material experiments, she sets a counterpoint to the pervasive digital world. Schober uses photography and freeze-frames, creates digital and analog collages and (re-)digitizes, paints over, or applies material objects to them. She integrates intentionally or randomly created structures elsewhere in her work. A major topic in Schober's work is a dynamic play with perspective and dimensions which continuously destabilizes the position of the viewer. The spontaneous, the accidental and art-trouvé is as important as the artist's personal involvement with the object or the topic. The focus is on liminal areas, precarious balances and pivotal moments in photography, sculpture, film and painting.

== Education ==
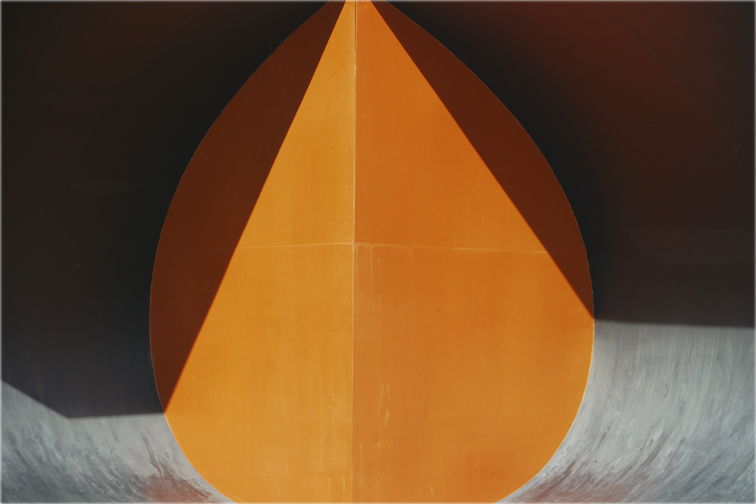
"KunstVisite Burri" – photographic work

Barbara Schober studied intermedial design at the State Academy of Visual Arts in Stuttgart in the class of Sotiros Michou and Moritz Baumgartl. Her work there focused on the topic of the "Imaginary Museum“. She also studied media practice at the Institute of Media Sciences at the University of Tübingen.

== Exhibitions and projects ==
International

- "Boundaries", Museum of Modern Art, Oxford (1990): International invitation to tender "Oxford Photography", curated by Trevor Ashby
- "Menas Be Sienų. Art Without Borders", Urban galleries of Šiauliai und Panevėžys, Lithuania (1992): Together with Lithuanian and Danish artists, it was the first international exchange project planned by artists in Lithuania since the Soviet era when only exhibitions organised by the state were allowed.
- "NowHere", Louisiana Museum of Modern Art In 1996 in Humlebaek, Denmark, as a visiting editor together with Bettina Lehmann of the Fanzine project Network Orange for the section of curator Ute Meta Bauer, she collaborated on "NowHere", a large-scale presentation of international contemporary art. The exhibition was organized in collaboration with four guest curators: Ute Meta Bauer, Iwona Blazwick, Laura Cottingham and Bruce Ferguson.
- "Durban meets Stuttgart. Stuttgart meets Durban", cultural exchange, Germany/South Africa, (1997): Project of the Association of Fine Artist, with Ingrid Hartlieb and Wolfgang Thiel
- SEA(S) International Conference (group exhibition), curated by Haytham Nawar, Ionian Center, Cephalonia, Greece, (2018)
- Society of Women Artists (SWA) 157th Annual Exhibition, selected for participation, Mall Galleries London, private view with HRH Princess Michael of Kent, curated by The Arts Society (2018)
- Biennale d'Arte Contemporanea, Terza Edizione, selected for participation in the Art Biennale Salerno, Italy (2018)
- "Herland - In Search of a Female Utopia", curated by Freya Black, group exhibition at the Women's Library, Sydney, Australia (2019)
- Jury Selection for the Biennale Larnaca, Cyprus, curated by Yev Kravt, Pierides Museum, Larnaca (2023)
- Artist Talk An Lantair, Stornoway, Isle of Lewis, Outer Hebrides, Scotland (2024)
- Jury Selection for the Arctic Circle Art & Science Residency, Svalbard, Norway (2024)

National (Germany)

- "Apropos Les Demoiselles d'Ameublement - for Eric Satie", stage project and performances (participation), State Academy of Visual Arts in Stuttgart (1987), under the direction of Sotirios Michou
- Gallery at Chamissoplatz, Berlin (1987), caricatures exhibition (participation)
- Curated annual exhibition of the members of the Württembergischer Kunstverein, Stuttgart (1987–92)
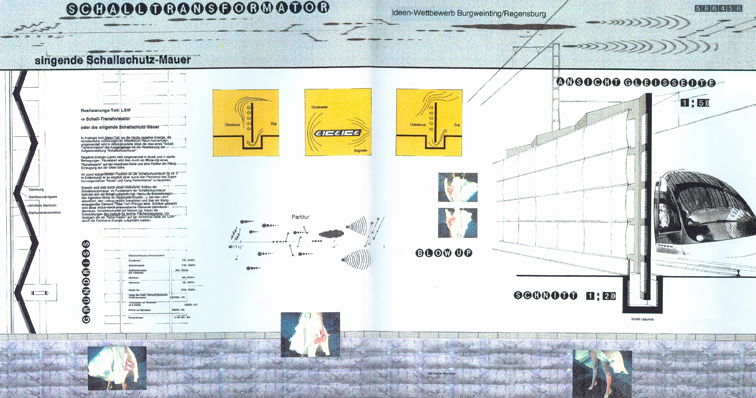
  Singing acoustic barrier, urbanistic ideas competition Burgweinting, conceptual design
  "Ein Video-Tag im Mai" Video-Festival Europe, competition, member of the jury, Sat1
- "Die Hallen - Rottenburgs Bauhaus", exhibitions and art projects of the studio collective (1990), Rottenburg
- "Skulpturenprojekt Tübingen", art in public spaces (1991)
- "Media Save Art", UNESCO-competition (participation), award for Daimler Benz AG (arwardee), Rome/Troy
- "Auf mein Zeichen, schießen Sie auf den Dirigenten!" (1992), (solo exhibition) Künstlerhaus Stuttgart, Foyer Druckwerkstätten
- "Ich kann eine Fledermaus mit einem Eierlöffel töten" (1993), Gallery Zehntscheuer (solo exhibition), Möglingen
- "Filmwinter Stuttgart", photo projects and internet café (1995/96), invitation from Ulrich Wegenast
- Ideas competition, festival site Dresden-Hellerau (1997), with architectural firm Bizer, series of interviews with Werner Schretzmeier and Dr. Helmut Volkmann (among others)
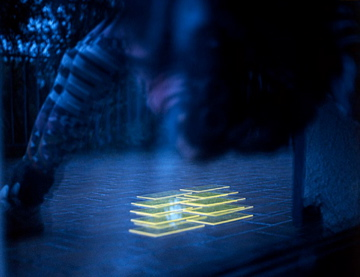
  "Waterloo", Acrylic glass multiple
  "Kunst Regensburg", ideas competition (1997/98), acoustic barrier, Burgweinting, with architectural firm Bizer
- Multi-Media-Performance (1998), Bonn Women's Museum
- Exhibition at Forum (solo exhibition) und open studio (2015), Bodelshausen
- ARTe Sindelfingen (2018) E 22, Sindelfingen, art fair
- Kunstschimmer (2018), Ulm, art fair
- 68. Bayreuth Art Exhibition (participation), Kunstverein Bayreuth e.V., Eremitage, west wing Neues Schloss, Bayreuth (2018)
- Berlin Art Week, selected for participation, LDX Artodrome Gallery, Berlin (2018)
- "function_anomy" International Intermissive Collective Call for Proposals, juried by Karlheinz Lüdeking (UdK Berlin), Karsten Konrad (UdK Berlin), Cornelia Gerner (Museum Reinickendorf), connected with an Artist in Residence Project in Paduli/Naples, Italy, at the Townhall Reinickendorf, Berlin (2019)
- "function_anomy" (group exhibition) by Intermission Collective, gallery Axel Obiger, Berlin (2020)
- Solo Exhibition Moonshots, ARTFORUM, Waldkirch (2022)
- Group Exhibition, Participation with "Battle Erasement" Sculpture, GEDOK, Stuttgart (2022)
- "Air Berlin" (group exhibition) by Intermission Collective, Villa Heike, Berlin (2020)
- Shortlistet for the C.A.R. Photo/Media ART TALENTS, Zollverein Coal Mine Industrial Complex (Zeche Zollverein), Essen (2023)
- Solo exhibition Palais Walderdorff, Trier, Germany (2023)
- ART Week for climate and environment - Participation - GEDOK Karlsruhe (2023)

== Art mediation ==
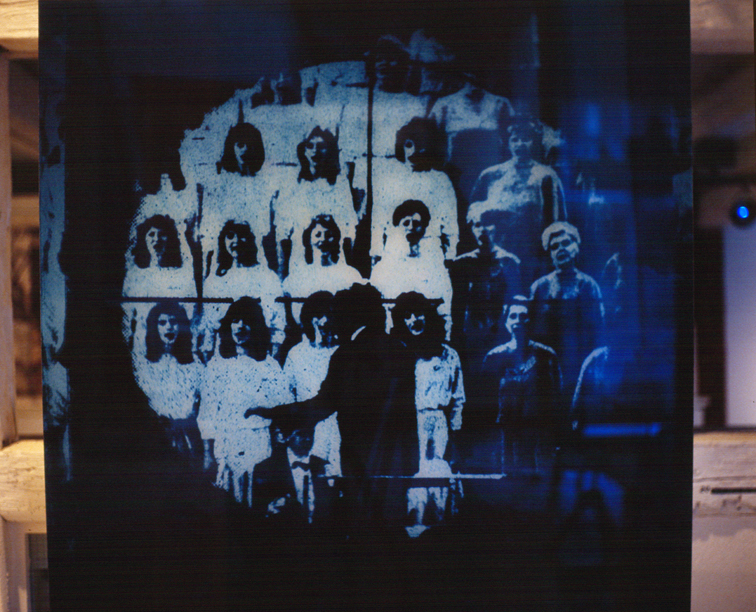
- "Auf mein Zeichen, schießen Sie auf den Dirigenten!", acrylic glass, exhibition view Künstlerhaus Stuttgart
  Social Media Analog - International exchange project "Shooting Back" (1995/96): Barbara Schober was responsible for this project organised by film and media workshop "Filmriss" in Stuttgart for young people from disadvantaged backgrounds. The project concentrated on Social Sculptures and was inspired by the work of Tim Rollins and K.O.S., Rita Fecher and her art class at Washington Irving Highschool in New York City. A series of interviews documented the similarities of K.O.S., Fecher and "Shooting Back". More background information and academic references can be found in the book "Fotografie als GegenKulturgut". Cooperating partners of the project were (among others): "Shooting Back" Inc. Media Center, Washington D.C./Minneapolis, Celina Lunsford/Fotografie Forum Frankfurt, Martin Kilgus of SDR foreign office (today: SWR International), Media Center of the German-speaking Community, Eupen/Belgium, Photographers Gallery, Education Office, London. The project was supported by Jugenstiftung Baden-Württemberg, the European Commission and the Federal Ministry of Family Affairs.
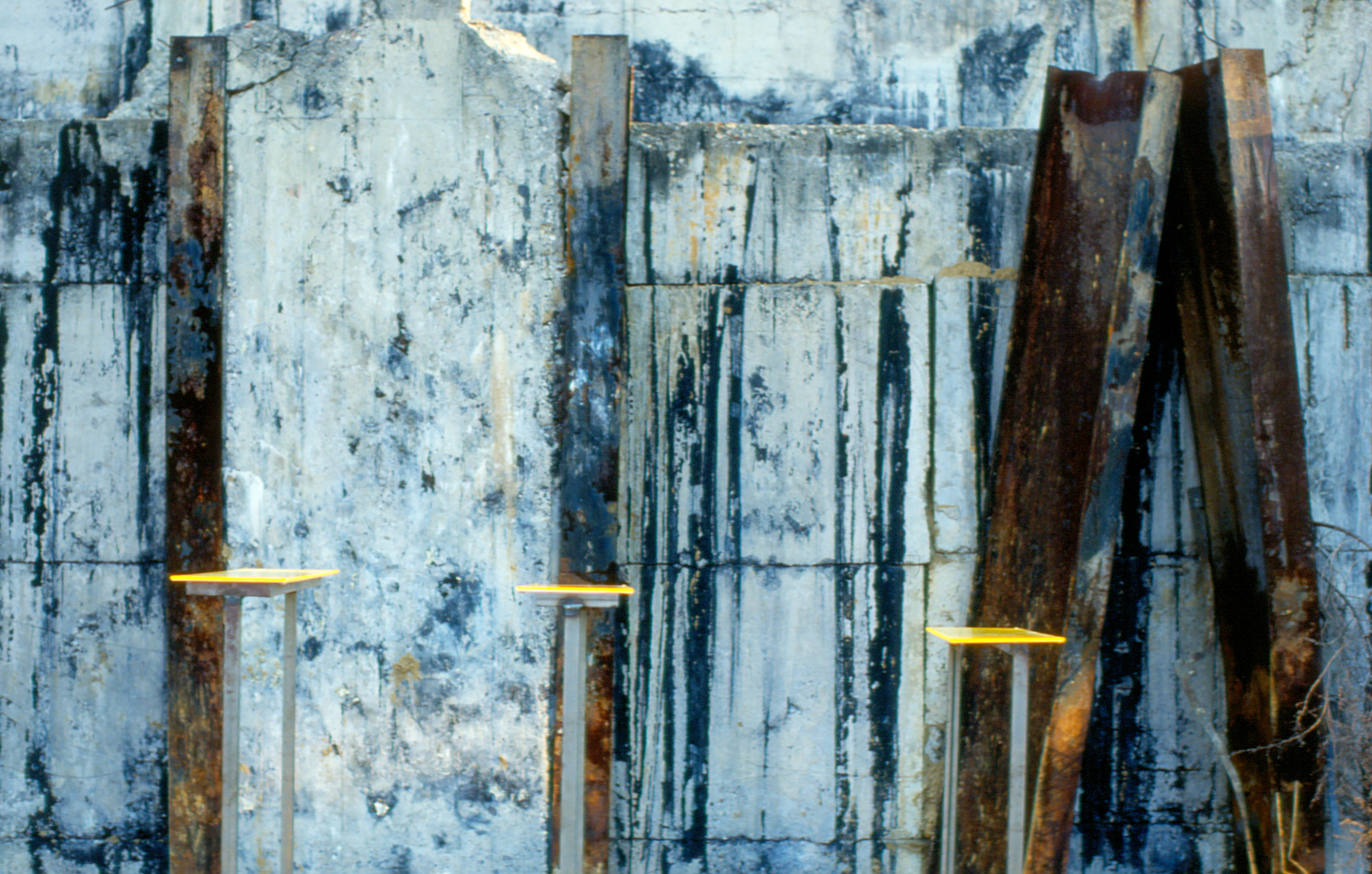
- "Die Hallen", Rottenburg, photo installation
  TV essay "Chaosordnung" (1992/93), SWF, director: Dietrich Mahlow: for this production, Barbara Schober undertook the tasks of the artistic and scientific consultant and assistant director in editing and directing. This film essay is a collage of artistic contributions with e.g. Tadeusz Kantor and John Cage, interviews and impressions from an exhibition at the Wilhelm-Hack-Museum in Ludwigshafen, which also focused on the topic of the relation between art and chaos. Contributing artists were: Max Bill, Oswald Mathias Ungers, Alfonso Hüppi, Helge Leiberg, Carlfriedrich Claus, Georg Nees, Jack Ox and Franz Mon.
- Seminar "Video-Skulptur", University of Tübingen (1990-1992), media arts festival Tübingen: As part of a pilot project which allowed artists to teach at universities ("Künstler an Hochschulen"), Barbara Schober gave a seminar on video sculptures together with Andreas Zeger. It developed into the initiative "Medienkunstfest" (media art festival), where international film productions associated with experimental art were shown. Participants and contributions: "Step Across the Border", "Der Lauf der Dinge" by Fischli/Weiss, Laurie Anderson on Stage, Else Gabriel, Gerd Wiedmaier and Klaus Illi (among others).

== Awards and honors ==
1987: ideas competition "Wallberg", work of art acquired by the city of Pforzheim

1990: "Model III vertikal", work of art acquired by the Ministry for Science, Research and Art of Baden-Wuerttemberg

1991: "Verrücken" Hölderlinturm, sculpturing project, acquired by the city of Tübingen

1995: Work of art acquired by the city of Chemnitz as part of sculpturing competition

2002: Georg von Holtzbrinck Prize for economic journalism (nominee), project: "Macchina X - Fabrik der Zukunft", with Jaron Lanier and Stanislaw Lem

2002: Prix Europa, Internet Exploration Award, project: "Macchina X - Fabrik der Zukunft", SWR3, ARD-online (nominee)

2002: Prix Italia, category: digital communication (nominee)

2018: Donau-Kunstpreis (3rd place)

2018: Prize Art Biennale Salerno, Italy, category: painting (3rd place)

2022. Grant for Participation (supported by the City of Stuttgart): ART INTERVENTIONS (ART in Public Space) by Karima Klasen

2024: Second Prize "icanmake.art Pacification" curated by Simon Rubin, Hongkong

== Published work ==
- function.anomy, 2019, Hrsg.: Bezirksamt Reinickendorf, department for building, education and culture, art and history
- 69. Bayreuther Kunstausstellung, 2019, Hrsg.: Kunstverein Bayreuth e.V.
- 68. Bayreuther Kunstausstellung, 2018, Hrsg.: Kunstverein Bayreuth e.V.
- Fotografie als GegenKULTURgut, Schober/Harten-Preiss, 1996, agenda zeitlupe, agenda Verlag Münster (ISBN 3-929440-75-X)
- Shooting Back, Schober/Harten-Preiss, 1996, in: Kunst und Unterricht, special issue on photography
- Schule des Sehens, Schober/Pehle, 1989, in: Video 06/89
