= Grounding in communication =

Knowledge, beliefs and assumptions

Grounding in communication is a concept proposed by Herbert H. Clark and Susan E. Brennan. It comprises the collection of "mutual knowledge, mutual beliefs, and mutual assumptions" that is essential for communication between two people. Successful grounding in communication requires parties "to coordinate both the content and process". The concept is also common in philosophy of language.

== Elements of theory ==
=== Grounding in conversation ===
Grounding in communication theory has described conversation as a form of collaborative action. While grounding in communication theory has been applied to mediated communication, the theory primarily addresses face-to-face conversation. Groups working together will ground their conversations by coming up with common ground or mutual knowledge. The members will utilize this knowledge in order to contribute to a more efficient dialogue. Grounding criterion is the mutual belief between conversational partners that everyone involved has a clear enough understanding of the concept to move forward.

Clark and Schaefer (1989) found that, to reach this state of grounding criterion, groups use three methods of reaching an understanding that they can move forward.

1. New contribution: A partner moves forward with a new idea, and waits to see if their partner expresses confusion.
2. Assertion of acceptance: The partner receiving the information asserts that he understands by smiling, nodding, or verbally confirming the other partner. They may also assert their understanding by remaining silent.
3. Request for clarification: The partner receiving the information asks for clarification.

==== Phases in grounding ====
The parties engaging in grounding exchange information over what they do or do not understand over the course of a communication and they will continue to clarify concepts until they have agreed on grounding criterion. There are generally two phases in grounding.

1. Presenting utterance – speaker presents utterance to addressee
2. Accepting utterance – addressee accepts utterance by providing evidence of understanding

According to this theory, mere utterance qualifies as presentation in conversation whereas contribution to conversation demands both utterance and assurance of mutual understanding.

The presentation phase can become complex when meanings are embedded or repairs are made to utterances. An example of a repair is "Do you and your husband have a car," but rather the messier, "now, – um do you and your husband have a j-car".

The acceptance phase often clarifies any ambiguities with grounding. For example:

Presentation phase:

Alan: Now, – um do you and your husband have a j-car

Acceptance phase:

Barbara: – have a car?
Alan: Yeah
Barbara: No

The acceptance phase is completed once Barbara indicates that the answer is "no" and Alan accepts it as a valid answer.

==== Evidence in conversation ====
Grounding theory identifies three common types of evidence in conversation: 'acknowledgements, relevant next turn, and continued attention.

Acknowledgements refer to back channel modes of communication that affirm and validate the messages being communicated. Some examples of these include, "uh huh," "yeah," "really," and head nods that act as continuers. They are used to signal that a phrase has been understood and that the conversation can move on.

Relevant next turn refers to the initiation or invitation to respond between speakers, including verbal and nonverbal prompts for turn-taking in conversation. Questions and answers act as adjacency pairs, the first part of the conversation is relevant to the second part. Meaning that a relevant utterance needs to be made in response to the question in order for it to be accepted. For example:

Miss Dimple: Where can I get a hold of you?
Chico: I don't know, lady. You see, I'm very ticklish.
Miss Dimple: I mean, where do you live?
Chico: I live with my brother.

Chico is revealing that he did not understand Miss Dimple's first question. She then corrects her phrase after realizing Chico's utterance wasn't an appropriate response and they continue to communicate with adjacent pairs.

Continued attention is the "mutual belief that addressees have correctly identified a referent." Partners involved in a conversation usually demonstrate this through eye gaze. One can capture their partner's gaze and attention by beginning an utterance. Attention that is undisturbed and not interrupted is an example of positive evidence of understanding. However, if one of the partners turns away or looks puzzled, these are signs that indicate there is no longer continued attention.

More evidence for grounding comes from a study done in 2014, in which dialogue between humans and robots was studied. The complexity of human-robot dialogue arises from the difference between the human's idea of what the robot has internalized versus the robot's actual internal representation of the real world. By going through the grounding process, this study concluded that human-robot grounding can be strengthened by the robot providing information to its partner about how it has internalized the information it has received.

=== Anticipation of what a partner knows ===
There are three main factors that allow speakers to anticipate what a partner knows.

1. Community co-membership: Members of a group with knowledge in a particular field could use technical jargon when communicating within the group, whereas communicating outside of the group would require them to use layman terms.
2. Linguistic co-presence: A party in a conversation can use a pronoun to refer to someone previously mentioned in the conversation.
3. Physical co-presence: If the other parties are also present physically, one could point to an object within their physical environment.

Shared visual information also aids anticipation of what a partner knows. For example, when responding to an instruction, performing the correct action without any verbal communication provides an indication of understanding, while performing the wrong action, or even failing to act, can signal misunderstanding. Findings from the paper (Using Visual Information for Grounding and Awareness in Collaborative Tasks), supports previous experiments and show evidence that collaborative pairs perform quicker and more accurately when they share a common view of a workspace. The results from the experiment showed that the pairs completed the task 30–40% faster when they were given shared visual information. The value of this information, however, depended on the features of the task. Its value increased when the task objects were linguistically complex and not part of the pairs‟ shared lexicon. However, even a small delay to the transmission of the visual information severely disrupted its value. Also, the ones accepting the instructions were seen to increase their spoken contribution when those giving the instructions do not have shared visual information. This increase in activity is due to the fact that it is easier for the former to produce the information rather than for the ones giving the instruction to continuously ask questions to anticipate their partners' understanding. Such a phenomenon is predicted by the grounding theory, where it is said that since communication costs are distributed among the partners, the result should shift to the method that would be the most efficient for the pair.

=== Least collaborative effort ===
The theory of least collaborative effort asserts that participants in a contribution try to minimize the total effort spent on that contribution – in both the presentation and acceptance phases. In exact, every participant in a conversation tries to minimize the total effort spent in that interactional encounter. The ideal utterances are informative and brief.

Participants in conversation refashion referring expressions and decrease conversation length. When interactants are trying to pick out difficult to describe shapes from a set of similar items, they produce and agree on an expression which is understood and accepted by both and this process is termed refashioning. The following is an example from Clark & Wilkes-Gibbs,

A: Um, third one is the guy reading with, holding his book to the left
B: Okay, kind of standing up?
A: Yeah.
B: Okay.

A offers a conceptualisation which is refashioned slightly by the B before it is agreed on by both. In later repetitions of the task, the expression employed to re-use the agreed conceptualisation progressively became shorter. For example, "the next one looks like a person who's ice skating, except they're sticking out two arms in front" (trial 1) was gradually shortened to "The next one's the ice skater" (trial 4) and eventually became just "The ice skater" in trial 6.

Clark & Wilkes-Gibbs argue that there are two indicators of least collaborative effort in the above example. First, the process of refashioning itself involves less work than A having to produce a 'perfect' referring expression first time, because of the degree of effort which would be needed to achieve that. Second, the decrease in length of the referring expressions and the concomitant reduction in conversation length over the trials showed that the participants were exploiting their increased common ground to decrease the amount of talk needed, and thus their collaborative effort.

1. Time pressures: Parties will select more effortful means of communication when mutual understanding must occur within a fixed amount of time.
2. Errors: Parties will select more effortful means of communication when the chance for error is high or previous low effort communications have resulted in error.
3. Ignorance: Parties will engage in more effortful communication when a lack of shared knowledge is notable.

Time pressures, errors, and ignorance are problems that are best remedied by mutual understanding, thus the theory of grounding in communication dispels the theory of least collaborative effort in instances where grounding is the solution to a communication problem.

=== Costs to grounding change ===
The lack of one of these characteristics generally forces participants to use alternative grounding techniques, because the costs associated with grounding change. There is often a trade-off between the costs- one cost will increase as another decreases. There is also often a correlation between the costs. The following table highlights several of the costs that can change as the medium of communication changes.

Cost	Description	Paid by
Formulation	Time and effort increase as utterances are created and revised and as utterances become more complicated.	Speaker
Production	Effort invested in producing a message varies depending on the medium of communication.	Speaker
Reception	Listening is generally easier than reading.	Addressee
Understanding	Costs are higher the more often that the addressee has to formulate the appropriate context of the conversation.	Addressee
Start-up	The cost of starting up a new discourse. Attention needs to be commanded, the message formulated, and the message needs to be received.	Both
Delay	The cost of delaying an utterance in order to more carefully plan, revise and execute the communication.	Both
Asynchrony	The cost associated with the work required to cue one participant to stop and another to start.	Both
Speaker change	The cost associated with the work required to cue one participant to stop and another to start.	Both
Display	The cost associated with displaying non-verbal cues.	Both
Fault	The cost associated with producing a mistaken message.	Both
Repair	The cost to repair the message and send the correct one.	Both

== Grounding in machine-mediated communication ==
=== Choice of medium ===
Clark and Brennan's theory acknowledges the impact of medium choice on successful grounding. According to the theory, computer mediated communication presents potential barriers to establishing mutual understanding. Grounding occurs by acknowledgement of understanding through verbal, nonverbal, formal, and informal acknowledgments, thus computer mediated communications reduce the number of channels through which parties can establish grounding.

=== Media constraints on grounding ===
Clark and Brennan identify eight constraints mediated communication places on communicating parties.

1. Copresence: Otherwise known as colocation. Group members are in the same physical location. If group members are not able to share the same physical environment, they cannot use the ability to see and hear and interact with what their partner is interacting with, thus slowing down the grounding process.
2. Visibility: Group members can see each other. Though video-conferencing allows groups to see each other's faces, it does not allow groups to see what each other are doing like copresence does.
3. Audibility: Groups can hear each other speaking. When groups are face-to-face they can take into account intonation and timing when coming to understandings or making decisions. Textual media like email and instant messages removes both of these aspects, and voice messages lack the timing aspect, thus making it difficult for the rest of the group to respond in a timely manner.
4. Contemporality: Group members are receiving information as it is produced by other group members. If a message is only received by one partner after a delay, their reaction to the message is also delayed. This damages efficiency since the partner may either mistakenly move forward in the wrong way or not be able to move on at all until they receive the message.
5. Simultaneity: Group members are receiving and producing information at the same time. In copresent groups, members can help the group come to grounding criterion by reacting when other members are speaking. For example, a member would make a statement and another would smile and nod while he spoke, thereby showing that an understanding has been made.
6. Sequentiality: Group members are receiving information in a consecutive sequence; one piece of a task at a time. In distributed groups messages are often few and far between. A member could receive a message via email and then might review several other messages before returning to the original task.
7. Reviewability: Group members can review information they previously received from other members. In face to face conversation group members might forget the details of what a teammate said, but when using technology like instant-messaging they can save and review what was said in a conversation at a later date.
8. Revisability: Group members can review their own messages before imparting information to their fellow group members. Using technology like email or instant messaging, group members can revise information to make it more clear before sending it to their fellow group members.

== Related concepts ==
=== Situation awareness ===
Situation awareness theory holds that visual information helps pairs assess the current state of the task and plan future actions. An example would be when a friend is solving a problem that you know the solution to, you could intervene and provide hints or instructions when you see that your friend is stuck and needs help. Similarly, the grounding theory maintains that visual information can support the conversations through evidence of common ground or mutual understanding. Using the same example, you could provide clearer instruction to the problem when you see that your friend is stuck. Therefore, an extension to both theories would mean that when groups have timely visual information, they would be able to monitor the situation and clarify instructions more efficiently.

=== Common ground (communication technique) ===
Common ground is a communication technique based on mutual knowledge as well as awareness of mutual knowledge. According to Barr, common ground and common knowledge are kinds of mutual knowledge. Common ground is negotiated to close the gap between differences in perspective and this in turn would enable different perspectives and knowledge to be shared. Psycholinguist Herbert H. Clark uses the example of a day at the beach with his son. They share their experiences at the beach and are aware of the mutual knowledge. If one were to propose the painting of a room a certain shade of pink, they could describe it by comparing it to a conch shell they saw at the beach. They can make the comparison because of their mutual knowledge of the pink on the shell as well as awareness of the mutual knowledge of the pink. This communication technique is often found in negotiation.

== Historical examples ==
Common ground in communication has been critical in mitigating misunderstandings and negotiations.

For example, common ground can be seen during the first Moon landing between Apollo 11 and mission control since mission control had to provide assistance and instructions to the crew in Apollo 11, and the crew had to be able to provide their situation and context for mission control. That was particularly difficult given the strict conditions in which the radio system needed to function. The success of the mission was dependent on the ability to provide situation information and instructions clearly. The transcripts show how often both parties checked to ensure that the other party had clearly heard what they had to say. Both parties needed to provide verbal feedback after they had listened because of the constraints of their situation.

== Consequences of a lack of common ground ==
=== Actor-observer effect ===
The difficulties of establishing common ground, especially in using telecommunications technology, can give rise to dispositional rather than situational attribution. This tendency is known as the "actor-observer effect". What this means is that people often attribute their own behavior to situational causes, while observers attribute the actor's behavior to the personality or disposition of the actor. For example, an actor's common reason to be late is due to the situational reason, traffic. Observers' lack of contextual knowledge about the traffic, i.e. common ground, leads to them attributing the lateness due to ignorance or laziness on the actor's part. This tendency towards dispositional attribution is especially magnified when the stakes are higher and the situation is more complex. When observers are relatively calm, the tendency towards dispositional attribution is less strong.

=== Disappointment ===
Another consequence of a lack of mutual understanding is disappointment. When communicating partners fail to highlight the important points of their message to their partner or know the important points of the partner's message, then both parties can never satisfy their partner's expectations. This lack of common ground damages interpersonal trust, especially when partners do not have the contextual information of why the other party behaves the way they did.

=== Multiple ignorances ===
People base their decisions and contribution based on their own point of view. When there is a lack of common ground in the points of views of individuals within a team, misunderstandings occur. Sometimes these misunderstandings remain undetected, which means that decisions would be made based on ignorant or misinformed point of views, which in turn lead to multiple ignorances. The team may not be able to find the right solution because it does not have a correct representation of the problem.

== Criticisms ==
Critiques of the approaches used to explore common ground suggest that the creation of a common set of mutual knowledge is an unobservable event which is hardly accessible to empirical research. It would require an omniscient point of view in order to look into the participants' heads. By modeling the common ground from one communication partner's perspective is a model used to overcome this ambiguity. Even so, it is difficult to distinguish between the concepts of grounding and situation awareness.

Distinguishing between situation awareness and grounding in communication can provide insights about how these concepts affect collaboration and furthering research in this area. Despite revealing evidence of how these theories exist independently, recognizing these concepts in conversation can prove to be difficult. Often both of these mechanisms are present in the same task. For example, in a study where Helpers had a small field of view and were able to see pieces being manipulated demonstrates grounding in communication. However, situation awareness is also present because there is no shared view of the pieces.

Another criticism of common ground is the inaccurate connotation of the term. The name appears to relate to a specific place where a record of things can be stored. However, it does not account for how those involved in conversation effortlessly understand the communication. There have been suggestions that the term common ground be revised to better reflect how people actually come to understand each other.

Grounding in communication has also been described as a mechanistic style of dialogue which can be used to make many predictions about basic language processing. Pickering and Garrod conducted many studies that reveal, when engaging in dialogue, production and comprehension become closely related. This process greatly simplifies language processing in communication. In Pickering and Garrod's paper Toward a Mechanistic Psychology of Dialogue, they discuss three points that exemplify the mechanistic quality of language processing:

1. By supporting a straightforward interactive inference mechanism
2. By enabling interlocutors to develop and use routine expressions
3. By supporting a system for monitoring language processing

Another component that is essential to this criticism on Grounding in Communication is that successful dialogue is coupled with how well those engaged in the conversation adapt to different linguistic levels. This process allows for the development of communication routines that allow for the process of comprehending language to be more efficient.

== See also ==
- Cognition
- Communication
- Common knowledge (logic)
- Media richness theory
- Situation awareness
