= Herbert H. Clark =

American psycholinguist

- Born: 1940 (age 85–86)
- Education: Stanford University (Bachelor of Arts); Johns Hopkins University (MA, PhD)
- Known for: Research in common ground
- Scientific career
- Fields: Psycholinguist
- Workplaces: Carnegie Mellon University; Stanford University
- Thesis: On the use and meaning of prepositions (1966)

Herbert Herb Clark (born 1940) is an American cognitive psychologist currently serving as Professor of Psychology at Stanford University. His focuses include cognitive and social processes in language use; interactive processes in conversation, from low-level disfluencies through acts of speaking and understanding to the emergence of discourse; and word meaning and word use. Together with Deanna Wilkes-Gibbs (1986), he also developed the collaborative model, a theory for explaining how people in conversation coordinate with one another to determine definite references. Clark's books include Semantics and Comprehension, Psychology and Language: An Introduction to Psycholinguistics, Arenas of Language Use and Using Language.

== Education and academic career ==
Clark, born in 1940, attended Stanford University until 1962 and received a B.A. with distinction. He attended Johns Hopkins University for post-graduate training, where he obtained his MA and his PhD, in 1964 and in 1966 respectively. After a postdoc at at the Linguistics Institute of University of California, Los Angeles, he worked at Carnegie Mellon University and Stanford University.

== Scientific career ==
=== Semantics and pragmatics ===
Clark's early work explored theories of comprehension. He found that people interpret verb phrases, particularly eponymous verb phrases, against a hierarchy of information presumed to be common knowledge between the listener and the speaker. This hierarchy of beliefs is composed of

1. The identity of the eponym,
2. Acts by the eponym,
3. Relevant acts of the eponym, and
4. The type of act being referred to.

For example, when a person instructed, "Do a Napoleon for the camera," the listener would identify Napoleon, recognize acts that were done by Napoleon (such as smiling, saying 'fromage', or posing for paintings), and then use the context to identify the act being referred to (tucking one's hand into one's jacket.)

Listeners would begin at level 1 with the broadest constraint and then, with each new constraint at levels 2, 3, and 4, find it easier to identify what the speaker intended as the relevant act. Listeners would proceed on a context-centered (the situation and what would be the appropriate act) or eponym-centered (the eponym what would be a relevant act) basis to get to the right meaning. Out of the requests "Please do a George Conklin for the camera," and "Please do a Napoleon for the camera," it would be hardest to progress past level 1 for George Conklin, presuming one may not even know who he is, and easiest to progress to level 4 for Napoleon, since of the known acts associated with him relevant ones come to mind easily. Another important finding by Clark was that salience is necessary for two people to understand exactly what is being referred to. Napoleon did eat and sleep during his lifetime, but saying, "Do a Napoleon at the kitchen table," to mean "eat" would create comprehension problems, because the salience of the act is limited.

=== Irony ===
In his study of irony, Clark examined the pretense theory, which states that two speakers in a conversation do not announce the pretense they make when speaking with irony, but do nevertheless expect the listener to see through it. Thus, common ground must be had by both speakers in order for the effect of irony to work. Irony contains three important features: asymmetry of affect, victims of irony, and ironic tone of voice.

Asymmetry of affect speaks to the higher likelihood of making ironic positive statements ("What a smart idea!" to a bad idea) than ironic negative statements ("What a stupid idea!" to a good one). Since those who are ignorant of irony would be more likely to cling to the general tendency of seeing the world in terms of success and excellence, these are the people that ironists pretend to be. Victims of irony are the people in conversation presumed not to understand the irony, such as the person that the speaker is pretending to be, or the person that could be the listener who wouldn't understand the irony in the speech. The ironic tone of voice is the voice a speaker takes on in lieu of his own in order to fully convey the pretense. Ironic tones of voices tend to be exaggerated and caricatured, like taking on a heavily conspiratorial voice when discussing a widely known piece of gossip.

The Mention Theory of irony states that sentences or phrases that are used in ironic speech are not being used, but are rather being mentioned. An example of this would be a person taking on the pretense of being a weatherman on the local news and saying, "What lovely weather it is! Rain, rain, and rain," with an exaggerated enthusiastic voice and not explicit statement of whom she's referencing. The speaker would not be using a sentence, in this case, but rather she would be mentioning what she has heard the weatherman say before. Taking on the pretense of an oblivious weatherman and saying, "What lovely weather it is!" when it is storming and dark outside is making mention of a phrase previously said by weathermen and expressing contempt toward it.

=== Speech acts ===
One of Clark's better-known studies was on how to make requests that overcome an obstacle to compliance. In making requests, speakers analyze the greatest potential obstacle they see to getting the information that they want, and frame their requests in a way that overcomes them in the easiest manner possible. They can frame the request in 3 different ways: to design an indirect request conditional on the absence or elimination of the obstacle, to make broadly applicable conditional requests, or to approach an obstacle sideways. For example, if a speaker wants to know the time of the concert he is attending with his friend, he knows his friend may not remember. He will therefore make an indirect request conditional on the elimination of the obstacle and ask, "Do you remember what time the concert is tonight?" which will mean "Do you remember what time the concert is, and can you tell me?" Therefore, if the friend does not remember, he can simply answer "no."

The second way is illustrated in more frequent and general situations where the obstacle isn't well known or specific. So if the speaker were to ask a passing stranger near the arena about the start time of the concert, he might formulate, "Can you tell me when the concert starts?" The expected obstacle is formed by lack of ability and willingness of the stranger to answer the question. It is a useful convention due to how it provides the stranger with a broad range of graceful excuses not to give the desired answer.

The last way of framing to overcome obstacles is for situations where the person being addressed seems unwilling to provide the information. Then the speaker can ask for related information that the addressee is willing to divulge, and the speaker appears polite while the addressee is not being forced to admit unwillingness. Whether the obstacle is being addressed directly or sidestepped, the speaker is still designing requests that best overcome the greatest expected obstacle.

=== Referring as a collaborative process ===
In conversation, in order to establish common ground and make referencing known concepts or objects easier, speakers work together to establish definite references. Unlike the literary model of definite reference, which takes into account only what the speaker does to create the definite reference; the conversational model has the speaker and the listener working together. The listener is interpreting at the same time as the speaker is talking, and the speaker may have to edit to rephrase what is being said based on how the listener reacts. Speaker A and speaker B must mutually accept the functionality and usefulness of A's reference before they can allow the conversation to go on. The belief that both have accepted the reference is established through a two-part process: (a) presentation and (b) acceptance. Speaker A presents a reference (e.g. the dog with the pink collar) and Speaker B accepts it by responding with the affirmation that he understood which dog was discussed. If A realizes the presentation wasn't definitive enough, he may edit his speech to be more specific (e.g. the dog with the pink collar, near the tree, by the parking lot over there). If B doesn't accept the presentation (e.g. the dog with the what? that's not a dog, that's a weasel), then A has to reissue the reference. Completing the acceptance process may take several exchanges between the speakers.

Clark later developed his theory on discourse and how each speaker, or contributor, takes part in it with his or her partners. The most important element of common ground in discourse, he found, was the mutual understanding of each utterance by all partners. If speaker A makes an utterance that he believes will create common ground with speaker B but speaker B misheard it or misunderstood it, no progress on common ground has been made. A contribution can be made in two ways: collectively and individually. Both A and B adding what A said to their common ground is a collective act. A contributing and B registering the contribution are two distinctive individual acts. Therefore, discourse does not progress until both collectively and individually the discourse partners have accepted new references and established them as common ground. If A assumes the contribution was successful and adds what he said to the common ground he may continue to build upon what he believes was established, but B has not registered the contribution correctly, then they'll have to start over until all three steps are satisfied. One assumption of this model is the principle of least collaborative effort: participants in a contribution try to minimize the total effort spent on that contribution, both in the presentation and acceptance phases. The fewer exchanges between A and B to clarify references, the more successfully the common ground is being built.

=== Common ground and grounding ===
Clark began his work in common ground with studying the references in conversation between experts and novices. To develop references in discourse, speakers try to establish the mutual belief that all speakers understand the references to a criterion that is sufficient for the purpose of continuing the discourse. In a conversation between a physician and his patient, for example, the doctor may request, "Contract your deltoid," making reference to a technical term that the patient may not know. If the patient doesn't know, he will ask, "My deltoid?" and the doctor will clarify, "Raise your right arm." If the patient does know the reference, he will comply immediately. Throughout these exchanges, speakers supply and acquire expertise. Clark test summarized the process into 3 stages: assessing (directly or in passing finding out the expertise level of the discourse partner), supplying (experts who are addressing novices can expand their contribution to explain the reference), and acquiring expertise (novices speaking to experts acquire knowledge and fill in the gaps during conversation). Perspective is also important to the conversations between experts and novices; as experts gain more expertise their understanding of the topic becomes more broad and abstract, taking on organization that novices cannot follow. When explaining certain concepts to novices, experts also have to take on the perspectives of novices to make the most effective references.

In a different study, Clark showed how coordinating beliefs in conversation shapes the effectiveness of references. When speaker A and speaker B are conversing, the references they use build common ground and allow them to make shorter inferences upon repeated use. So while the first reference may be "the dog with the pink leash next to the birch tree," the second reference may become "the dog near the birch tree", and the third may be "the birch tree dog". But when a conversation partner C only listens to the conversation between A and B and doesn't participate, the references made earlier (although he heard all of them) are not as efficient when C switches places with B. As a matter of fact, he is treated like a novice in the conversation, despite having heard A and B use the references previously. Thus speakers redevelop common ground with new partners and create new references that both were presented with and accepted.

Most recently Clark studied how speakers monitor their addresses for understanding when giving directions, making references, or developing common ground. In a study where subjects used Legos to build copies of a prototype, subjects were divided into builders and those who were instructing the building. Some were able to see each other clearly as well as each other's workspaces, while others' views were obstructed in some way. The pairs of partners who could clearly see each other and the instructing and the building that was happening had more success with their process than the pairs who could not see each other. The ability to see the builder's workspace enabled the instructor to nod, point, and otherwise aid the builder in precise and efficient ways. Those who couldn't see the workspace made more errors, due to lack of affirmation by the instructor and the inability to check how successfully they were following directions. Lastly, those who listened to the instructions from an audiotape without an instructor present were even less efficient with their building. This finding demonstrated how a conversation is a collaborative process, and that speakers and listeners work together to achieve a common goal. The ability to interact to maintain common ground throughout discourse or any communicational process allows for both parties to feel like they're keeping up.

=== Addressees and overhearers ===
Similarly to the Lego study, Clark examined the differences in understanding and compliance between addressees and overhearers. In an experiment where one person told another person how to arrange 12 complex figures and a third person listened in, and all began the conversation as strangers with equal background information. Nevertheless, addressees were more accurate at following the directions and arranging the figures than the overhearers even though they heard exactly the same things. From this, Clark concluded that the social process of interacting in conversation plays a central role in the cognitive process of understanding. If hearing the same words were enough to understand the directions, addresses and overhearers would have performed similarly. Since they did not, there is cause to conclude that understanding is part of a collaborative process. The process of grounding in a conversation happens at the point where both A and B find a perspective they can agree on. If C, the overhearer, understands this perspective then he keeps up; if he does not, then he is left behind. Since he's an overhearer, his understanding does not affect whether A and B continue on, and while they continue to build common ground for the remainder of the conversation, C is not following or understanding them.

=== Disfluencies and strategies in speaking ===
Clark worked with Jean E. Fox Tree to study the pronunciation of 'the' and 'thee' and their use in signaling problems while speaking. What they found was that the shorter pronunciation of 'the', phonetically thuh, was used far less frequently to show a problem in speech production. Only 7% of thuhs were followed by a suspension of speech due to articulation errors, word retrieval, or choice of message consideration. However, the longer pronunciation, thiy, was used 81% of the time to signal an immediate oncoming pause. Thiy was frequently followed by a pause and reformulation of speech and could also foreshadow the use of thuh before speech resumed its regular pace. 20% of the time thiy is used, speakers can repair the problem in time and continue without further disruption, but 80% of the time they deal with the problem by pausing, repeating the article, repairing what they were about to say, or abandoning the original plans for speech altogether.

A similar study by the same researchers examined 'uh' and 'um' in spontaneous speaking. Like thiy and thuh, um and uh signal varying degrees of delay, which um creating a major pause and uh creating a minor one. Because of how they are incorporated into speech, such as specifically put to use at certain pauses in speech, attached as clitics onto other words, and prolonged for additional meaning, they have become a part of spontaneous speech that have meaning. What they argued was that um and uh are conventional English words and speakers plan for them, formulate them, and produce them just like any other vocabulary.

=== Joint actions ===
Conversations as joint projects were where Clark explored vertical and horizontal transitions prompted by dialogue. A horizontal transition, for example, would be speaker A beginning a stage of a conversation about a car he and speaker B saw. Until speaker B understands the car being referenced, the exchange will be horizontal within the same joint project of understanding the reference. Once B recognizes the reference and the car is no longer the joint action of the speakers, they have made a vertical transition in dialogue. Clark proposed that m-hm, uh-huh, yeah, yes, and yep are all horizontal markers that do not interrupt the flow of the joint activity. They are used as continuers and display to the speaker that the listener is following the exchange and the speaker still has the floor. As long as horizontal markers are used, they are allowing the current speaker to continue with their action. Once the speaker's action is interrupted with side projects, such as clarifying what model car is being discussed or where it was seen, a vertical transition was made and is completed once the original speaker has the floor again. A digression by speaker can cause a vertical transition as well: by the way and as a matter of fact, and exits from the transition are prompted by anyway and so. Some words, like okay are universally used for a variety of transitions, like digression, vertical transition, and horizontal transition. Speakers understand and use these markers seamlessly and precisely in conversation to coordinate joint actions and maintain common ground for future direct reference.

== Professional positions ==
- Assistant Member of the Technical Staff, Bell Telephone, Laboratories Murray Hill, New Jersey, Summer 1963
- Resident Visitor, Bell Telephone Laboratories, Murray Hill, New Jersey, Summer 1964-1965
- Post-doctoral Visitor, Linguistic Institute UCLA, Summer 1966
- Assistant Professor, Department of Psychology, Carnegie Mellon University, 1966-1969
- Assistant Professor, Department of Psychology, Stanford University, 1969–1975
- Professor, Department of Psychology Stanford University 1975–present
- Chair, Department of Psychology, Stanford University, 1987–1990
- Visiting Associate Professor, Summer Institute of Linguistics, University of California, Santa Cruz, Summer 1971
- Honorary Research Fellow, University College London, 1975–1976
- Sloan Visiting Scientist, Massachusetts Institute of Technology, Summer 1978
- Visiting Scientist, Max Planck Institute for Psycholinguistics, Nijmegen, The Netherlands, Summers 1979, 1981, and academic years 1983-84, 1990–91, 1997–98

== Honors and awards ==
- NSF Graduate Fellowship, Johns Hopkins University, 1963–1966
- John Simon Guggenheim Fellowship, 1975–1976
- Fellow, Division 3, American Psychological Association, elected 1978
- Fellow, Center for Advanced Study in the Behavioral Science, 1978–1979
- Fellow, American Academy of Arts and Sciences, elected 1982
- Member, Society of Experimental Psychologists, elected 1984
- Foreign Member, Koninklijke Nederlandse Academie van Wetenschappen (Royal Netherlands Academy of Arts and Sciences) elected 2000
- Fellow, Cognitive Science Society, elected 2004
- Recipient, James McKeen Cattell Sabbatical Fellowship 2005-2006

== Sources ==
- Clark, H. H. (1985). Language use and language users. In G. Lindzey & E. Aronson (Eds.), Handbook of social psychology (3rd ed., pp. 179–231). New York: Harper and Row.
- Clark, H. H., 1996. Using Language. Cambridge University Press, hardbound, ISBN 0-521-56158-2, paperbound, ISBN 0-521-56745-9
- Isaacs, E. A.; Clark, H. H. (1987). "References in conversations between experts and novices". Journal of Experimental Psychology: General. 116: 26–37. doi:10.1037/0096-3445.116.1.26. S2CID 15157423.
- Clark, H. H.; Schaefer, E. F. (1989). "Contributing to discourse". Cognitive Science. 13 (2): 259–294. doi:10.1207/s15516709cog1302_7.
- Clark, H. H.; Krych, M. A. (2004). "Speaking while monitoring addressees for understanding". Journal of Memory and Language. 50 (1): 62–81. doi:10.1016/j.jml.2003.08.004.
- Schober, M. F.; Clark, H. H. (1989). "Understanding by addressees and overhearers". Cognitive Psychology. 21 (2): 211–232. doi:10.1016/0010-0285(89)90008-x. S2CID 18595735.
- Fox Tree, J. E.; Clark, H. H. (1997). "Pronouncing "the" as "thee" to signal problems in speaking". Cognition. 62 (2): 151–167. doi:10.1016/s0010-0277(96)00781-0. PMID 9141905. S2CID 46200953.
- Clark, H. H.; Fox Tree, J. E. (2002). "Using uh and um in spontaneous speech". Cognition. 84 (1): 73–111. doi:10.1016/s0010-0277(02)00017-3. PMID 12062148. S2CID 37642332.
- Clark, H. H.; Wilkes-Gibbs, D. (1986). "Referring as a collaborative process". Cognition. 22 (1): 1–39. doi:10.1016/0010-0277(86)90010-7. PMID 3709088. S2CID 204981390.
- Isaacs, E. A.; Clark, H. H. (1987). "References in conversations between experts and novices". Journal of Experimental Psychology: General. 116: 26–37. doi:10.1037/0096-3445.116.1.26. S2CID 15157423.
- Clark, H. H.; Schaefer, E. F. (1989). "Contributing to discourse". Cognitive Science. 13 (2): 259–294. doi:10.1207/s15516709cog1302_7.
- Francik, E. P.; Clark, H. H. (1985). "How to make requests that overcome obstacles to compliance". Journal of Memory and Language. 24 (5): 560–568. doi:10.1016/0749-596x(85)90046-4.
- Bangerter, A.; Clark, H. H. (2003). "Navigating joint projects with dialogue" (PDF). Cognitive Science. 27 (2): 195–225. doi:10.1207/s15516709cog2702_3.
- Clark, H. H.; Gerrig, R. J. (1983). "Understanding old words with new meanings". Journal of Verbal Learning and Verbal Behavior. 22 (5): 591–608. doi:10.1016/s0022-5371(83)90364-x.
