= Gernot Grabher =

Gernot Grabher (born 13 April 1960 in Dornbirn, Austria) is an economic geographer and Professor of Urban and Regional Economic Studies at the HafenCity University Hamburg. He received his Ph.D. in 1987 at Vienna University of Technology, and held positions at the Wissenschaftszentrum Berlin (WZB), King's College London, the University of Konstanz and the University of Bonn. Grabher was Visiting Professor at Columbia University, Copenhagen Business School, Santa Fe Institute, Cornell University and the Institute of Advanced Study in the Behavioral Sciences. Between 2007 and 2011 he was co-editor of Economic Geography. Currently, he is co-editor of the Regions and Cities book series of the Regional Studies Association. Gernot Grabher is internationally renowned for his research on networks, regional evolution and decline, and project organization.

== Selected works ==
- (with O. Ibert und S. Flohr) The Neglected King: Consumers in the New Knowledge Ecology of Innovation. In: Economic Geography 84(3), 2008.
- Trading Routes, Bypasses, and Risky Intersections: Mapping the Travels of ‘Networks’ between Economic Sociology and Economic Geography. In: Progress in Human Geography 30(2), 2006.
- Temporary Architectures of Learning: Knowledge Governance in Project Ecologies. In: Organization Studies 25(9), 2004.
- (with W. W. Powell), Networks. Cheltenham: Edward Elgar (Critical Studies in Economic Institutions Series), 2004.
- (with D. Stark), Restructuring Networks in Post-Socialism: Legacies, Linkages, and Localities. Oxford: Oxford University Press, 1997.
- The Embedded Firm. On the Socioeconomics of Industrial Networks. London and New York: Routledge, 1993.
