= Algorithmic management =

Algorithmic management is a term used to describe certain labor management practices in the contemporary digital economy. In scholarly uses, the term was initially coined in 2015 by Min Kyung Lee, Daniel Kusbit, Evan Metsky, and Laura Dabbish to describe the managerial role played by algorithms on the Uber and Lyft platforms, but has since been taken up by other scholars to describe more generally the managerial and organisational characteristics of platform economies. However, digital direction of labor was present in manufacturing already since the 1970s and algorithmic management is becoming increasingly widespread across a wide range of industries.

The concept of algorithmic management can be broadly defined as the delegation of managerial functions to algorithmic and automated systems. Algorithmic management has been enabled by "recent advances in digital technologies" which allow for the real-time and "large-scale collection of data" which is then used to "improve learning algorithms that carry out learning and control functions traditionally performed by managers". The term does not refer to a specific underlying technology, and encompasses the design choices, organisational policies, and governance that surround the managerial use of algorithms in workplaces.

In the contemporary workplace, firms employ an ecology of accounting devices, such as "rankings, lists, classifications, stars and other symbols' in order to effectively manage their operations and create value without the need for traditional forms of hierarchical control." Many of these devices fall under the label of what is called algorithmic management, and were first developed by companies operating in the sharing economy or gig economy, functioning as effective labor and cost-cutting measures. The Data&Society explainer of the term, for example, describes algorithmic management as 'a diverse set of technological tools and techniques that structure the conditions of work and remotely manage workforces. Data&Society also provides a list of five typical features of algorithmic management:

- Prolific data collection and surveillance of workers through technology;
- Real-time responsiveness to data that informs management decisions;
- Automated or semi-automated decision-making;
- Transfer of performance evaluations to rating systems or other metrics; and
- The use of "nudges" and penalties to indirectly incentivize worker behaviors.

Proponents of algorithmic management claim that it "creates new employment opportunities, better and cheaper consumer services, transparency and fairness in parts of the labour market that are characterised by inefficiency, opacity and capricious human bosses." On the other hand, critics of algorithmic management claim that the practice leads to several issues, especially as it impacts the employment status of workers managed by its new array of tools and techniques.

== History of the term ==
"Algorithmic management" was first described by Lee, Kusbit, Metsky, and Dabbish in 2015 in their study of the Uber and Lyft platforms. In their study, Lee et al. termed "software algorithms that assume managerial functions and surrounding institutional devices that support algorithms in practice" algorithmic management. Software algorithms, it was said, are increasingly used to "allocate, optimize, and evaluate work" by platforms in managing their vast workforces. In Lee et al.'s paper on Uber and Lyft this included the use of algorithms to assign work to drivers, as mechanisms to optimise pricing for services, and as systems for evaluating driver performance. In 2016, Alex Rosenblat and Luke Stark sought to extend on this understanding of algorithmic management "to elucidate on the automated implementation of company policies on the behaviours and practices of Uber drivers." Rosenblat and Stark found in their study that algorithmic management practices contributed to a system beset by power asymmetries, where drivers had little control over "critical aspects of their work", whereas Uber had far greater control over the labor of its drivers.

Since this time, studies of algorithmic management have extended the use of the term to describe the management practices of various firms, where, for example, algorithms "are taking over scheduling work in fast food restaurants and grocery stores, using various forms of performance metrics ad even mood... to assign the fastest employees to work in peak times." Algorithmic management is seen to be especially prevalent in gig work on platforms, such as on Upwork and Deliveroo, and in the sharing economy, such as in the case of Airbnb.

Furthermore, recent research has defined sub-constructs that fall under the umbrella term of algorithmic management, for example, "algorithmic nudging". A Harvard Business Review article published in 2021 explains: "Companies are increasingly using algorithms to manage and control individuals not by force, but rather by nudging them into desirable behavior — in other words, learning from their personalized data and altering their choices in some subtle way." While the concept builds on nudging theory popularized by University of Chicago economist Richard Thaler and Harvard Law School professor Cass Sunstein, "due to recent advances in AI and machine learning, algorithmic nudging is much more powerful than its non-algorithmic counterpart. With so much data about workers' behavioral patterns at their fingertips, companies can now develop personalized strategies for changing individuals' decisions and behaviors at large scale. These algorithms can be adjusted in real-time, making the approach even more effective."

== Relationships with other labor management practices ==
Algorithmic management has been compared and contrasted with other forms of management, such as Scientific management approaches, as pioneered by Frederick Taylor in the early 1900s. Henri Schildt has called algorithmic management "Scientific management 2.0", where management "is no longer a human practice, but a process embedded in technology." Similarly, Kathleen Griesbach, Adam Reich, Luke Elliott-Negri, and Ruth Milkman suggest that, while "algorithmic control over labor may be relatively new, it replicates many features of older mechanisms of labor control."

On the other hand, some commentators have argued that algorithmic management is not simply a new form of Scientific management or digital Taylorism, but represents a distinct approach to labor control in platform economies. David Stark and Ivana Pais, for example, state that,

"In contrast to Scientific Management at the turn of the twentieth century, in the algorithmic management of the twenty-first century there are rules but these are not bureaucratic, there are rankings but not ranks, and there is monitoring but it is not disciplinary. Algorithmic management does not automate bureaucratic structures and practices to create some new form of algorithmic bureaucracy. Whereas the devices and practices of Taylorism were part of a system of hierarchical supervision, the devices and practices of algorithmic management take place within a different economy of attention and a new regime of visibility. Triangular rather than vertical, and not as a panopticon, the lines of vision in algorithmic management are not lines of supervision."

Similarly, Data&Society's explainer for algorithmic management claims that the practice represents a marked departure from earlier management structures that more strongly rely on human supervisors to direct workers. In analyzing the difference and the similarities to previous management styles, David Stark and Pieter Vanden Broeck expand the applicability of algorithmic management beyond the workplace. They develop a theory of algorithmic management in terms of broader changes in the shape and structure of organization in the 21st century, attentive to the erosion of organization's boundaries whereby heterogeneous actors, assets, and activities, are coopted regardless of their place in organizational space. Stark and Vanden Broeck propose the following means of differentiating algorithmic management from other historical managerial paradigms:

| | Scientific management | Collaborative management | Algorithmic management |
|---|---|---|---|
| Organizational form | The factory | The project | The platform |
| Object of management | Supervise labor | Coordinate specialists | Co-opt many types of user |
| Ideology | Efficiency | Flexibility | Immediacy |
| Modality | Standardized | Diversified | Synthetic |
| Accountability | Vertical | Horizontal | Twisted |

== Issues ==
Algorithmic management can provide an effective and efficient means of workforce control and value creation in the contemporary digital economy. However, commentators have highlighted several issues that algorithmic management poses, especially for the workers it manages. Criticisms of the practice often highlight several key issues pertaining to algorithmic management practices, such as the imperfection and scope of its surveillance and control measures, which also threaten to lock workers out of key decision-making processes; its lack of transparency for users and information asymmetries; its potential for bias and discrimination; its dehumanizing tendencies; and its potential to create conditions which sidestep traditional employer-employee accountability. This last point has been especially contentious, as algorithmic management practices have been utilised by firms to reclassify workforces as independent contractors rather than employees. In the legal context, algorithmic management complicates traditional labor classifications. Scholars point out that tools like dynamic pricing and reinforcement learning function as a form of structural subordination, acting as automated mechanisms of discipline and labor allocation. This technological reality has generated significant jurisprudential conflicts, such as the divergence in Brazil between labor courts—which often recognize an employment bond based on algorithmic control—and the Federal Supreme Court, which tends to uphold civil contracting arrangements under the premise of free enterprise. These negative consequences particularly affect migrant workers, who are integrated into existing labour processes under worse conditions utilising linguistically configurable algorithmic management. Another critical issue is related to the lack of transparency of these devices, which is worse in the employment context as it increases the already existent information asymmetries between the parties to a contract of employment. These issues in some cases led to public criticism, lawsuits, and wildcat strikes by workers. However, employment and data protection laws, at least in Europe, seems to have many regulatory antibodies to foster algorithmic transparency in the workplace and consequently uncover the violation of those rules already limiting abuses of managerial prerogatives by employers.
