= Michael Schober =

American psychologist (born 1964)

Michael F. Schober (born November 7, 1964) is an American psychologist who is currently the dean of The New School for Social Research in New York City. He began teaching at The New School in 1992 as an assistant professor.

His own academic background began at Brown University, where he earned a Bachelor of Science in cognitive science. He then pursued a Ph.D. at Stanford University in psychology. Further credits to his name include: the editor of the journal Discourse Processes, and a member of the Society of Experimental Social Psychology and the Psychonomic Society.

Schober also actively engages in research while fulfilling his duties as professor at the New School for Social Research. Some of his research interests are within the fields of, but not limited to: linguistics, psychology, music, public opinion research analysis, and artificial intelligence.

His interest in music may stem from the fact that he is a classical pianist. His sister, Monica Schober is a German Lieder recitalist. He has performed solo, but specializes in chamber and collaborative music. In February 2003, Michael Schober accompanied his sister in a performance of Wagner’s Wesendonck Lieder and selected songs of Richard Strauss, Hugo Wolf, and Johannes Brahms at Steinway Hall in New York City.

== Research interests ==
Schober identifies himself on his personal webpage as a psychologist who "studies how people coordinate their actions, the mental processes underlying that coordination, and how new technologies mediate coordination."

Schober's publications are used in many psycholinguistic-based classes at universities across the United States to achieve an up-to-date look at empirical research in the field of psychology specifically psycholinguistics. Schober's work focuses on concepts important to understanding human communications.

Some of these most popular publications were in collaboration with Herbert H. Clark, a professor at Stanford University. Michael Schober studied with Clark while attending Stanford University, Clark being a professional and academic mentor to Schober.

Schober's first recorded publication was in 1989. It was entitled “Addressees and Overhearers” and was published with Herbert H. Clark. In this article the collaborative view is used to discuss the way individuals understand each other during a conversation, or any situation where a speaker addresses another individual to convey information. Schober and Clark propose that addressees have an advantage to speakers and overhearers because in conversations individuals accumulate information based on common ground. The research leading to the publication of this article included experiments using students at the university level. In the first experiment 10 pairs of students were given two roles: director and matcher. The director was recorded while giving directions for the matcher on how to complete an arrangement of twelve in a particular order. The recording of the director was then played for 40 'overhearers.' The second experiment used the same task and number of pairs, but this time the overhearers joined the groups and listened to the conversations. The participants were all separated from each other by visual barriers and precautions were taken to rule out extraneous variables.

A more recent publication in 2004 in collaboration with Fredrick G. Conrad and Scott S. Fricker was entitled “Misunderstanding standardized language in research interviews. In this study two types of experiments were used to understand the way in which individuals interpret words in survey interviews, aptitude tests, and instructions accompanying an experiment. One experiment was a factorial experiment, and the other was a more naturalistic investigation. Participants were required to interpret ordinary survey concepts such as: household furniture. The results show that an investigators actions influence the participants’ answers in both experiments. Study one suggests that interviewers should, in fact, be trained to give clarification when conveying instructions to participants of a study/experiment. Study two suggests that following a script too strictly can lead to a poorer understanding of the information that the interviewer is trying to convey.
