= Information overload =

Decision making with too much information

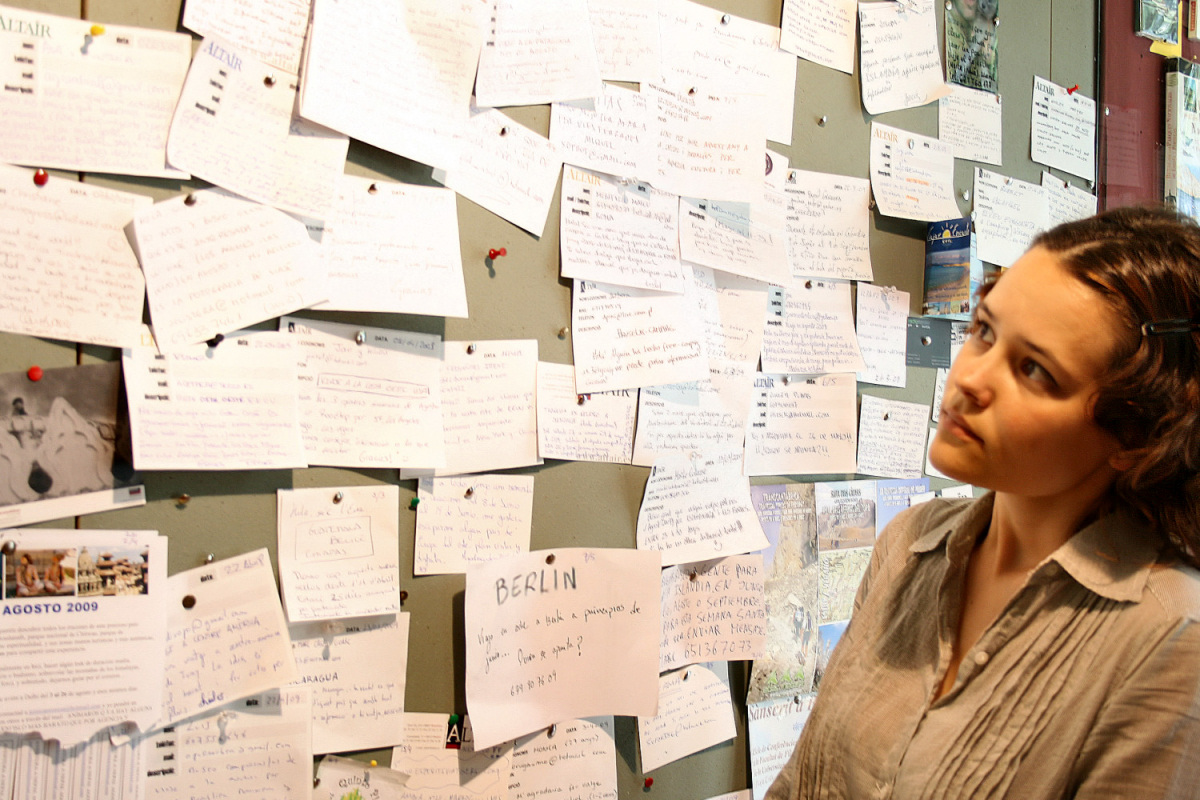
Woman reads bulletin board published in Argentine newspaper Diario Uno (Mendoza) in 2009.

Information overload, also known as infobesity, infoxication, or information anxiety, is the difficulty in understanding an issue and effectively making decisions when one has too much information (TMI) about that issue, and is generally associated with the excessive quantity of daily information. The term "information overload" was first used as early as 1962 by scholars in management and information studies, including in Bertram Gross' 1964 book The Managing of Organizations and was further popularized by Alvin Toffler in his bestselling 1970 book Future Shock. According to Speier et al. (1999), if input exceeds the processing capacity, information overload occurs, which is likely to reduce the quality of the decisions.

In a newer definition, Roetzel (2019) focuses on time and resources aspects. He states that when a decision-maker is given many sets of information, such as complexity, quantity, and contradiction, the quality of its decision is decreased because of the individual's limitation of scarce resources to process all available information and arrive at the optimal decision.

The advent of modern information technology has been a primary driver of information overload on multiple fronts: in quantity produced, ease of dissemination, and breadth of the audience reached. The advent of social media has further exacerbated longstanding technological factors, including the attention economy, which facilitates attention theft. In the age of connective digital technologies, informatics, and Internet culture (or the digital culture), information overload is associated with over-exposure, excessive information consumption, and input abundance of information and data.

== Origin of the term ==
Even though information overload is linked to digital cultures and technologies, Ann Blair notes that the term itself predates modern technologies, as indications of information overload were apparent when humans began collecting manuscripts, collecting, recording, and preserving information. One of the first social scientists to notice the negative effects of information overload was the sociologist Georg Simmel (1858–1918), who hypothesized that the overload of sensations in the modern urban world caused city dwellers to become jaded and interfered with their ability to react to new situations. The social psychologist Stanley Milgram (1933–1984) later used the concept of information overload to explain bystander behavior.

Psychologists have recognized for many years that humans have a limited capacity to store current information in memory. Psychologist George Armitage Miller was very influential in this regard, proposing that people can process about seven chunks of information at a time. Miller says that under overload conditions, people become confused and are likely to make poorer decisions based on the information they have received as opposed to making informed ones.

A quite early example of the term "information overload" can be found in an article by Jacob Jacoby, Donald Speller and Carol Kohn Berning, who conducted an experiment on 192 housewives which was said to confirm the hypothesis that more information about brands would lead to poorer decision making.

Long before that, the concept was introduced by Diderot, although it was not by the term "information overload":

As long as the centuries continue to unfold, the number of books will grow continually, and one can predict that a time will come when it will be almost as difficult to learn anything from books as from the direct study of the whole universe. It will be almost as convenient to search for some bit of truth concealed in nature as it will be to find it hidden away in an immense multitude of bound volumes.

— Denis Diderot, "Encyclopédie" (1755)

In the internet age, the term "information overload" has evolved into phrases such as "information glut", "data smog", and "data glut" (Data Smog, Shenk, 1997). In his abstract, Kazi Mostak Gausul Hoq commented that people often experience an "information glut" whenever they struggle with locating information from print, online, or digital sources. What was once a term grounded in cognitive psychology has evolved into a rich metaphor used outside the world of academia.

== History ==
=== Early history ===
Information overload has been documented throughout periods where advances in technology have increased a production of information. As early as the 3rd or 4th century BC, people regarded information overload with disapproval. Around this time, in Ecclesiastes 12:12, the passage revealed the writer's comment "of making books there is no end" and in the 1st century AD, Seneca the Elder commented, that "the abundance of books is distraction". In 1255, the Dominican Vincent of Beauvais, also commented on the flood of information: "the multitude of books, the shortness of time and the slipperiness of memory." Similar complaints around the growth of books were also mentioned in China. There were also information enthusiasts. The Library of Alexandria was established around the 3rd century BCE or 1st century Rome, which introduced acts of preserving historical artifacts. Museums and libraries established universal grounds of preserving the past for the future, but much like books, libraries were only granted with limited access.

=== Renaissance ===
Renaissance humanists always had a desire to preserve their writings and observations, but were only able to record ancient texts by hand because books were expensive and only the privileged and educated could afford them. Humans experience an overload in information by excessively copying ancient manuscripts and replicating artifacts, creating libraries and museums that have remained in the present. Around 1453 AD, Johannes Gutenberg invented the printing press and this marked another period of information proliferation. As a result of lowering production costs, generation of printed materials ranging from pamphlets, manuscripts to books were made available to the average person.

Following Gutenberg's invention, the introduction of mass printing began in Western Europe. Information overload was often experienced by the affluent, but the circulation of books were becoming rapidly printed and available at a lower cost, allowing the educated to purchase books. Information became recordable, by hand, and could be easily memorized for future storage and accessibility. This era marked a time when inventive methods were established to practice information accumulation. Aside from printing books and passage recording, encyclopedias and alphabetical indexes were introduced, enabling people to save and bookmark information for retrieval. These practices marked both present and future acts of information processing.

Swiss scientist Conrad Gessner commented on the increasing number of libraries and printed books, and was most likely the first academic who discussed the consequences of information overload as he observed how "unmanageable" information came to be after the creation of the printing press.

Blair notes that while scholars were elated with the number of books available to them, they also later experienced fatigue with the amount of excessive information that was readily available and overpopulated them. Scholars complained about the abundance of information for a variety of reasons, such as the diminishing quality of text as printers rushed to print manuscripts and the supply of new information being distracting and difficult to manage. Erasmus, one of the many recognized humanists of the 16th century asked, "Is there anywhere on earth exempt from these swarms of new books?".

=== 18th century ===
Many grew concerned with the rise of books in Europe, especially in England, France, and Germany. From 1750 to 1800, there was a 150% increase in the production of books. In 1795, German bookseller and publisher Johann Georg Heinzmann said "no nation printed as much as the Germans" and expressed concern about Germans reading ideas and no longer creating original thoughts and ideas.

To combat information overload, scholars developed their own information records for easier and simply archival access and retrieval. Modern Europe compilers used paper and glue to cut specific notes and passages from a book and pasted them to a new sheet for storage. Carl Linnaeus developed paper slips, often called his botanical paper slips, from 1767 to 1773, to record his observations. Blair argues that these botanical paper slips gave birth to the "taxonomical system" that has endured to the present, influencing both the mass inventions of the index card and the library card catalog.

=== Information Age ===
In his book, The Information: A History, A Theory, A Flood, published in 2011, author James Gleick notes that engineers began taking note of the concept of information, quickly associated it in a technical sense: information was both quantifiable and measurable. He discusses how information theory was created to first bridge mathematics, engineering, and computing together, creating an information code between the fields. English speakers from Europe often equated "computer science" to "informatique, informatica, and Informatik". This leads to the idea that all information can be saved and stored on computers, even if information experiences entropy. But at the same time, the term information, and its many definitions have changed.

In the second half of the 20th century, advances in computer and information technology led to the creation of the Internet.

In the modern Information Age, information overload is experienced as distracting and unmanageable information such as email spam, email notifications, instant messages, Tweets and Facebook updates in the context of the work environment. Social media has resulted in "social information overload", which can occur on sites like Facebook, and technology is changing to serve our social culture.

In today's society, day-to-day activities increasingly involve the technological world where information technology exacerbates the number of interruptions that occur in the work environment. Management may be even more disrupted in their decision making, and may result in more poor decisions. Thus, the PIECES framework mentions information overload as a potential problem in existing information systems.

As the world moves into a new era of globalization, an increasing number of people connect to the internet to conduct their own research and are given the ability to contribute to publicly accessible data. This has elevated the risk for the spread of misinformation.

In a 2018 literature review, Roetzel indicates that information overload can be seen as a virus—spreading through (social) media and news networks.

The latest research hypothesizes that information overload is a multilevel phenomenon, i.e., there are different mechanisms responsible for its emergence at the individual, group, and the whole society levels, however, these levels are interlinked.

== General causes ==
In a piece published by Slate, Vaughan Bell argues that "Worries about information overload are as old as information itself" because each generation and century will inevitably experience a significant impact with technology. In the 21st century, Frank Furedi describes how an overload in information is metaphorically expressed as a flood, which is an indication that humanity is being "drowned" by the waves of data coming at it. This includes how the human brain continues to process information whether digitally or not. Information overload can lead to "information anxiety", which is the gap between the information that is understood and the information that it is perceived must be understood. The phenomenon of information overload is connected to the field of information technology (IT). IT corporate management implements training to "improve the productivity of knowledge workers". Ali F. Farhoomand and Don H. Drury note that employees often experience an overload in information whenever they have difficulty absorbing and assimilating the information they receive to efficiently complete a task because they feel burdened, stressed, and overwhelmed.

At New York's Web 2.0 Expo in 2008, Clay Shirky's speech indicated that information overload in the modern age is a consequence of a deeper problem, which he calls "filter failure", where humans continue to overshare information with each other. This is due to the rapid rise of apps and unlimited wireless access. In the modern information age, information overload is experienced as distracting and unmanageable information such as email spam, email notifications, instant messages, Tweets, and Facebook updates in the context of the work environment. Social media has resulted in "social information overload", which can occur on sites like Facebook, and technology is changing to serve our social culture. As people view increasing amounts of information in the form of news stories, emails, blog posts, Facebook statuses, Tweets, Tumblr posts and other new sources of information, they become their own editors, gatekeepers, and aggregators of information. Social media platforms create a distraction as users attention spans are challenged once they enter an online platform. One concern in this field is that massive amounts of information can be distracting and negatively impact productivity and decision-making and cognitive control. Another concern is the "contamination" of useful information with information that might not be entirely accurate (information pollution).

The general causes of information overload include:

- A rapidly increasing rate of new information being produced, also known as journalism of assertion, which is a continuous news culture where there is a premium put on how quickly news can be put out; this leads to a competitive advantage in news reporting, but also affects the quality of the news stories reported.
- The ease of duplication and transmission of data across the Internet.
- An increase in the available channels of incoming information (e.g. telephone, email, instant messaging, RSS)
- Ever-increasing amounts of historical information to view.
- Contradictions and inaccuracies in available information, which is connected to misinformation.
- A low signal-to-noise ratio.
- A lack of a method for comparing and processing different kinds of information.
- The pieces of information are unrelated or do not have any overall structure to reveal their relationships.

=== Email ===
Email remains a major source of information overload, as people struggle to keep up with the rate of incoming messages. As well as filtering out unsolicited commercial messages (spam), users also have to contend with the growing use of email attachments in the form of lengthy reports, presentations, and media files.

A December 2007 New York Times blog post described email as "a $650 billion drag on the economy", and the New York Times reported in April 2008 that "email has become the bane of some people's professional lives" due to information overload, yet "none of [the current wave of high-profile Internet startups focused on email] really eliminates the problem of email overload because none helps us prepare replies".

In January 2011, Eve Tahmincioglu, a writer for NBC News, wrote an article titled "It's Time to Deal With That Overflowing Inbox". Compiling statistics with commentary, she reported that there were 294 billion emails sent each day in 2010, up from 50 billion in 2009. Quoted in the article, workplace productivity expert Marsha Egan stated that people need to differentiate between working on email and sorting through it. This meant that rather than responding to every email right away, users should delete unnecessary emails and sort the others into action or reference folders first. Egan then went on to say "We are more wired than ever before, and as a result need to be more mindful of managing email or it will end up managing us."

The Daily Telegraph quoted Nicholas Carr, former executive editor of the Harvard Business Review and the author of The Shallows: What The Internet Is Doing To Our Brains, as saying that email exploits a basic human instinct to search for new information, causing people to become addicted to "mindlessly pressing levers in the hope of receiving a pellet of social or intellectual nourishment". His concern is shared by Eric Schmidt, chief executive of Google, who stated that "instantaneous devices" and the abundance of information people are exposed to through email and other technology-based sources could be having an impact on the thought process, obstructing deep thinking, understanding, impeding the formation of memories and making learning more difficult. This condition of "cognitive overload" results in diminished information retaining ability and failing to connect remembrances to experiences stored in the long-term memory, leaving thoughts "thin and scattered". This is also manifest in the education process.

=== Web accuracy ===
In addition to email, the World Wide Web has provided access to billions of pages of information. In many offices, workers are given unrestricted access to the Web, allowing them to manage their own research. The use of search engines helps users to find information quickly. However, information published online may not always be reliable, due to the lack of authority-approval or a compulsory accuracy check before publication. Internet information lacks credibility as the Web's search engines do not have the abilities to filter and manage information and misinformation. This results in people having to cross-check what they read before using it for decision-making, which takes up more time. Viktor Mayer-Schönberger, author of Delete: The Virtue of Forgetting in the Digital Age, argues that everyone can be a "participant" on the Internet, where they are all senders and receivers of information. On the Internet, trails of information are left behind, allowing other Internet participants to share and exchange information. Information becomes difficult to control on the Internet.

The BBC reports that "every day, the information we send and receive online – whether that's checking emails or searching the internet – amount to over 2.5 quintillion bytes of data."

=== Social media ===
Social media are applications and websites with an online community where users create and share content with each other, and it adds to the problem of information overload because so many people have access to it. It presents many different views and outlooks on subject matters so that one may have difficulty taking it all in and drawing a clear conclusion. Information overload may not be the core reason for people's anxieties about the amount of information they receive in their daily lives. Instead, information overload can be considered situational. Social media users tend to feel less overloaded by information when using their personal profiles, rather than when their work institutions expect individuals to gather a mass of information. Most people see information through social media in their lives as an aid to help manage their day-to-day activities and not an overload. Depending on what social media platform is being used, it may be easier or harder to stay up to date on posts from people. Facebook users who post and read more than others tend to be able to keep up. On the other hand, Twitter users who post and read a lot of tweets still feel like it is too much information (or none of it is interesting enough). Another problem with social media is that many people create a living by creating content for either their own or someone else's platform, which can create for creators to publish an overload of content.

== Effects of information overload ==
In the context of searching for information, researchers have identified two forms of information overload: outcome overload where there are too many sources of information and textual overload where the individual sources are too long. This form of information overload may cause searchers to be less systematic. When the amount of input exceeds an individual's processing capacity, it can reduce the quality of the final decision and outcome. Disillusionment when a search is more challenging than expected may result in an individual being less able to search effectively. Information overload when searching can result in a satisficing strategy.Information Overload also can distort an individual's ability to process and assess information in everyday situations. When someone is exposed to more information than they can effectively manage, they may in turn have difficulties in identifying relevant details, comparing sources, and making sound decisions. These complications are rather relevant in digital environments, where individuals are frequently susceptible to massive amounts of information through websites, social media, and the many forms of online communication.

== Responding to information overload ==
Savolainen identifies filtering and withdrawal as common responses to information. Filtering involves quickly working out whether a particular piece of information, such as an email, can be ignored based on certain criteria. Withdrawal refers to limiting the number of sources of information with which one interacts. They distinguish between "pull" and "push" sources of information, a "pull" source being one where one seeks out relevant information, a "push" source one where others decide what information might be interesting. They note that "pull" sources can avoid information overload but by only "pulling" information one risks missing important information.

There have been many solutions proposed for how to mitigate information overload. Research examining how people seek to control an overloaded environment has shown that people purposefully using different coping strategies. In general, overload coping strategy consists of two excluding (ignoring and filtering) and two including (customizing and saving) approaches. Excluding approach focuses on managing the quantity of information, while including approach is geared towards complexity management.

1. Excluding approach involve the acts of reducing the amount of incoming information. This strategy aims to reduce cognitive burden by decreasing the quantity of information to process through filtering or ignoring. Ignoring is an implicit method, while filtering is explicit, with the main difference being the presence of exposure. Various strategies of excluding, such as reducing the number or volume of information sources and filtering news based on relevance have been described. Research shows that people are more likely to adopt excluding strategy when they feel overloaded.
2. Including approach, on the other hand, is a proactive approach where individuals select relevant and important news for consumption, so that one does not miss essential information while preventing excessive "cognitive" energy use. Customization and prioritizing are several examples of this type of strategy. Customization, a concept originating from marketing, is one way to organize news based on user preferences. This approach enhances the ability to process information – related to information processing where how a person records, molds, and stores information is crucial. Another inclusion approach is saving. People save or bookmark online content that they come across to read later when they have more time. This strategy does not limit the amount of information acquired but instead focuses on allocating the necessary resources for information processing.

Johnson advises discipline which helps mitigate interruptions and for the elimination of push or notifications. He explains that notifications pull people's attentions away from their work and into social networks and emails. He also advises that people stop using their iPhones as alarm clocks which means that the phone is the first thing that people will see when they wake up leading to people checking their email right away.

Clay Shirky states:

What we're dealing with now is not the problem of information overload, because we're always dealing (and always have been dealing) with information overload... Thinking about information overload isn't accurately describing the problem; thinking about filter failure is.

Consider the use of Internet applications and add-ons such as the Inbox Pause add-on for Gmail. This add-on does not reduce the number of emails that people get but it pauses the inbox. Burkeman in his article talks about the feeling of being in control is the way to deal with information overload which might involve self-deception. He advises to fight irrationality with irrationality by using add-ons that allow you to pause your inbox or produce other results. Reducing large amounts of information is key.

Dealing with IO from a social network site such as Facebook, a study done by Humboldt University showed some strategies that students take to try and alleviate IO while using Facebook. Some of these strategies included: Prioritizing updates from friends who were physically farther away in other countries, hiding updates from less-prioritized friends, deleting people from their friends list, narrowing the amount of personal information shared, and deactivating the Facebook account.

=== The problem of organization ===
Decision makers performing complex tasks have little if any excess cognitive capacity. Narrowing one's attention as a result of the interruption is likely to result in the loss of information cues, some of which may be relevant to completing the task. Under these circumstances, performance is likely to deteriorate. As the number or intensity of the distractions/interruptions increases, the decision maker's cognitive capacity is exceeded, and performance deteriorates more severely. In addition to reducing the number of possible cues attended to, more severe distractions/interruptions may encourage decision-makers to use heuristics, take shortcuts, or opt for a satisficing decision, resulting in lower decision accuracy.

Some cognitive scientists and graphic designers have emphasized the distinction between raw information and information in a form that can be used in thinking. In this view, information overload may be better viewed as organization underload. That is, they suggest that the problem is not so much the volume of information but the fact that it cannot be discerned how to use it well in the raw or biased form it is presented. Authors who have taken this view include graphic artist and architect Richard Saul Wurman and statistician and cognitive scientist Edward Tufte. Wurman uses the term "information anxiety" to describe humanity's attitude toward the volume of information in general and their limitations in processing it. Tufte primarily focuses on quantitative information and explores ways to organize large complex datasets visually to facilitate clear thinking. Tufte's writing is important in such fields as information design and visual literacy, which deal with the visual communication of information. Tufte coined the term "chartjunk" to refer to useless, non-informative, or information-obscuring elements of quantitative information displays, such as the use of graphics to overemphasize the importance of certain pieces of data or information.

=== Responding to information overload in email communication ===
In a study conducted by Soucek and Moser (2010), they investigated what impact a training intervention on how to cope with information overload would have on employees. They found that the training intervention did have a positive impact on IO, especially on those who struggled with work impairment and media usage, and employees who had a higher amount of incoming emails.

=== Responses of business and government ===
Recent research suggests that an "attention economy" of sorts will naturally emerge from information overload, allowing Internet users greater control over their online experience with particular regard to communication mediums such as email and instant messaging. This could involve some sort of cost being attached to email messages. For example, managers charging a small fee for every email received – e.g. $1.00 – which the sender must pay from their budget. The aim of such charging is to force the sender to consider the necessity of the interruption. However, such a suggestion undermines the entire basis of the popularity of email, namely that emails are free of charge to send.

Economics often assumes that people are rational in that they have the knowledge of their preferences and an ability to look for the best possible ways to maximize their preferences. People are seen as selfish and focus on what pleases them. Looking at various parts on their own results in the negligence of the other parts that work alongside it that create the effect of IO. Lincoln suggests possible ways to look at IO in a more holistic approach by recognizing the many possible factors that play a role in IO and how they work together to achieve IO.

=== In medicine ===
It would be impossible for an individual to read all the academic papers published in a narrow speciality, even if they spent all their time reading. A response to this is the publishing of systematic reviews such as the Cochrane Reviews. Richard Smith argues that it would be impossible for a general practitioner to read all the literature relevant to every individual patient they consult with and suggests one solution would be an expert system for use of doctors while consulting.

== Related terms ==
- The similar term information pollution was coined by Jakob Nielsen in 2003
- The term interruption overload has begun to appear in newspapers such as the Financial Times.
- "TL;DR" (too long; didn't read), another initialism alluding to information overload, this one normally used derisively.
- Analysis paralysis
- Cognitive dissonance
- Cognitive load
- Continuous partial attention
- Internet addiction
- Learning curve
- Memory
- Multi-tasking

== See also ==
- Age of Interruption
- Alarm fatigue
- Attention economy
- Attention management
- Culture shock
- Exocortex
- Filter bubble
- Glass cockpit
- Infodemic
- Information–action ratio
- Information Age
- Information ecology
- Information explosion
- Information filtering system
- Information management
- Information pollution
- Lexicographic information cost
- Museum fatigue
- Overchoice
- Stress management
- Technological singularity
- Time management
- TL;DR
- Too Much To Know, a 2011 book about information overload
- Accelerando, a 2005 science fiction novel about information overload and accelerating change
- Data Smog, a 1997 book about information overload
