= Harris Cooper =

American academic social psychologist and an author

- Born: United States
- Occupation: Academic psychologist
- Awards: Raymond B. Cattell Early Career Award for Programmatic Research, American Educational Research Association (1984); Frederick Mosteller Award for Contributions to Research Synthesis Methodology, International Campbell Collaboration (2007); Ingram Olkin Award for Distinguished Lifetime Contribution to Research Synthesis, Society for Research Synthesis Methodology (2008)

Academic background
- Education: B.A., psychology and sociology M.A., psychology Ph.D., social psychology
- Alma mater: State University of New York at Stony Brook; University of Connecticut

Harris Cooper is an American academic social psychologist and an author of nonfiction books. He is the Hugo L. Blomquist Distinguished Professor Emeritus at Duke University.

Cooper is best known for his works on research synthesis methodology and educational policies and practices. Among his authored works are publications in academic journals, including Psychological Bulletin and American Psychologist as well as books such as Research Synthesis and Meta-Analysis: A Step-by-Step Approach and Ethical Choices in Research: Managing Data, Writing Reports, and Publishing Results in the Social Sciences. He is the recipient of the 2008 Ingram Olkin Award from the Society of Research Synthesis Methodology.

Cooper is the editor-in-chief of the journal American Psychologist.

== Education ==
Cooper completed his B.A. in Psychology and Sociology from the State University of New York at Stony Brook. He then attended the University of Connecticut where he received a M.A. in Psychology and a Ph.D. in Social Psychology.

== Career ==
Cooper commenced his academic career at Colgate University, where he briefly served as an instructor of psychology. Subsequently, he joined the faculty at the University of Missouri-Columbia, where he assumed various roles, including assistant professor of psychology, associate professor of psychology, and professor of psychological sciences. He was awarded the Frederick Middlebush Professor of Psychology in 2003.

From 2003 to 2020, Cooper assumed the position of professor of psychology and neuroscience at Duke University. In 2015, he was awarded the position of Hugo L. Blomquist Distinguished Professor. Since 2020, he has held the title of Hugo L. Blomquist Distinguished Professor Emeritus at Duke University.

From 2009 to 2015, Cooper held the position of chair in the Department of Psychology and Neuroscience at Duke University. Subsequently, he served as interim Dean of Social Sciences at Duke between 2017 and 2018.

Cooper was the editor-in-chief for the Psychological Bulletin from 2003 to 2009. Between 2012 and 2015, he was appointed as the co-editor for the journal Archives of Scientific Psychology. Between 2009 and 2015, he held an appointment as the chief editorial advisor for the APA's journal publishing program. In 2021, he became the editor-in-chief of American Psychologist, the flagship journal of the American Psychological Association, for a term spanning 2021 to 2026.

== Research ==
Cooper's research interests encompass two primary areas. The first area revolves around research synthesis and research methodology. He, along with his students, has authored over 30 research syntheses.

Cooper's research extends to the intersection of social and developmental psychology with education policy. Specifically, he has studied the effects of homework on achievement and family dynamics. He investigated the correlation between time and learning. His research focus is directed towards the structure of the school calendar as well as academic-related situations encountered by children during periods when school is not in session.

== Media coverage ==
Cooper's work has been prominently featured in various media outlets. He has been a guest on shows such as USA Today Weekend, CBS This Morning, CNN Headline News, ABC Nightly News, Good Morning America, Nickelodeon Nick News, and The Oprah Winfrey Show. On radio, he has made appearances on NPR's Talk of the Nation, The Larry King Show, Now Hear This, and the Mitch Ablom Show. Media coverage of his research extends to publications such as the Wall Street Journal, New York Times, Newsweek, Time, Reader's Digest, the New Yorker, and NBC Dateline. Additionally, specialized publications like Parents, Parenting, and Child magazines, The American Teacher and NEA Today have also featured his work.

== Works ==
=== Academic books ===
Cooper has authored numerous books throughout his career. His book, Research Synthesis and Meta-Analysis: A Step-by-Step Approach (2017) is in its 5th edition. One of his recent edited publications titled The Handbook of Research Synthesis and Meta-Analysis (2nd ed., 2019), serves as a guide for social and behavioral science researchers, offering insights and techniques for the entire research synthesis process, covering statistical and non-statistical aspects, and providing practical advice on results communication.

Cooper authored the book titled Ethical Choices in Research: Managing Data, Writing Reports, and Publishing Results in the Social Sciences. The book offers guidance on navigating ethical considerations throughout the stages of a research project involving human participants, emphasizing early planning and addressing ethical problems from project planning to report preparation, data management, and publication.

Cooper is Editor-in-Chief of the American Psychological Association's Handbook of Research Methods in Psychology (2nd ed., 2023). The Handbook includes over 100 chapters on various aspects of research design and analysis, including both qualitative and quantitative approaches to research.

Cooper chaired the first APA committee that developed guidelines for information about research that should be included in manuscripts submitted to APA journals. He also published a book on the topic, titled Reporting Research in Psychology: How to Meet the New Standards for Journal Articles (2nd ed., 2019).

=== Non-fiction books ===
Cooper has authored non-fiction books as well. His book American History Through a Whiskey Glass delves into the integral role played by bourbon and rye whiskey in significant events. The narrative combines factual depictions of historical occurrences with anecdotes and quotes from the key figures involved as well era-specific whiskeys, recipes, and music playlists.

His other book, titled Finding America in a Minor League Ballpark: A Season Hosting for the Durham Bulls, recounts Cooper's experiences as a Seating Bowl Host for the minor league baseball team. The narrative also includes a concise history of minor league baseball, the city of Durham and the Bulls. It introduces the individual profiles of ballplayers, emphasizing personal backgrounds over on-field statistics. The book also features analysis of twelve baseball movies that focus on baseball not played in the major leagues.

== Awards and honors ==
- 1984 – Raymond B. Cattell Early Career Award, American Educational Research Association
- 1992 – Gold Chalk Award, University of Missouri-Columbia
- 1997 – Interpretive Scholarship Award, American Educational Research Association
- 2007 – Outstanding Review of Research, American Educational Research Association
- 2007 – Frederick Mosteller Award, International Campbell Collaboration
- 2008 – Ingram Olkin Award, Society for Research Synthesis Methodology

== Bibliography ==
=== Books ===
==== Academic ====
- Pygmalion Grows Up: Studies in the Expectation Communication Process (1983) ISBN 9780582284012
- Homework (1989) ISBN 9780801302084
- Meta-Analysis for Explanation: A Casebook (1992) ISBN 9780871542281
- Synthesizing Research: A Guide for Literature Reviews (1998) ISBN 9780761913481
- Making the Most of Summer School: A Meta-Analytic and Narrative Review (Monographs of the Society for Research in Child Development) (2000) ISBN 9780631221524
- The Battle Over Homework: Common Ground for Administrators, Teachers, and Parents (2007) ISBN 9781412937139
- Reporting Research in Psychology: How to Meet the New Standards for Journal Articles (2010) ISBN 9781433809163
- Research Synthesis and Meta-analysis: A Sep-by-step Approach (2015) ISBN 9781483331157
- Ethical Choices in Research: Managing data, writing reports, and publishing results, in the social sciences (2016) ISBN 9781433821684
- Research Synthesis and Meta-Analysis: A Step-by-Step Approach (2017) ISBN 9781483331157
- Critical Thinking About Research: Psychology and Related Disciplines (2018) ISBN 9781433827105
- The Handbook of Research Synthesis and Meta-Analysis (2019) ISBN 9780871540058
- Handbook of Research Methods in Psychology (2023) ISBN 9781433841231

==== Non-fiction ====
- American History Through a Whiskey Glass (2021) ISBN 9781510764019
- Finding America in a Minor League Ballpark: A Season Hosting for the Durham Bulls (2024) ISBN 9781510778603

=== Selected articles ===
- DeNeve, K. M., & Cooper, H. (1998). The happy personality: a meta-analysis of 137 personality traits and subjective well-being. Psychological bulletin, 124(2), 197.
- DuBois, D. L., Holloway, B. E., Valentine, J. C., & Cooper, H. (2002). Effectiveness of mentoring programs for youth: A meta‐analytic review. American journal of community psychology, 30(2), 157–197.
- DePaulo, B. M., Lindsay, J. J., Malone, B. E., Muhlenbruck, L., Charlton, K., & Cooper, H. (2003). Cues to deception. Psychological bulletin, 129(1), 74.
- Cooper, H., Robinson, J. C., & Patall, E. A. (2006). Does homework improve academic achievement? A synthesis of research, 1987–2003. Review of educational research, 76(1), 1–62.
- Cooper, H., & Koenka, A. C. (2012). The overview of reviews: unique challenges and opportunities when research syntheses are the principal elements of new integrative scholarship. American Psychologist, 67(6), 446.
