= Marie Diener-West =

American statistician

- Education: Johns Hopkins University; Loyola University of Chicago
- Known for: Biostatistics; Epidemiology; Collaborative Ocular Melanoma Study (COMS)
- Scientific career
- Fields: Statistics; Biostatistics
- Workplaces: Johns Hopkins University

Marie Diener-West is the Helen Abbey and Margaret Merrell Professor of Biostatistics and the chair of the Master of Public Health Program at Johns Hopkins Bloomberg School of Public Health. Diener-West is an editor for the Cochrane Eyes and Vision Group and a member of the American Public Health Association, American Statistical Association, Association for Research in Vision and Ophthalmology, and the Society for Clinical Studies.

== Education and career ==
Diener-West earned a B.S., magna cum laude, degree in both Mathematics and Biology from Loyola University Chicago in 1977, earning the "Best Biology Student Award." While working on her Ph.D., she worked as a Teaching and Research Assistant in the Departments of Biostatistics and Epidemiology at Johns Hopkins University (1978-1981) and as a Senior Statistician in the Radiation Therapy and Oncology Group at the American College of Radiology in Philadelphia (1983-1986). Diener-West went on to earn her Ph.D. in Biostatistics from the Johns Hopkins School of Hygiene and Public Health.

In 1986, Diener-West was awarded a joint appointment at Johns Hopkins University as an assistant professor in both the department of Biostatistics at Johns Hopkins School of Hygiene and Public Health and the department of ophthalmology at the Johns Hopkins School of Medicine. During her joint appointment, Diener-West became the Study Statistician and Deputy Director of the Coordinating Center for the Collaborative Ocular Melanoma Study (COMS) at Johns Hopkins School of Medicine, a position she held from 1986–2005. In 1989, she worked for the Save the Children Federation as a statistician in Kathmandu, Nepal. In 1990, Diener-West returned to her joint appointment at Johns Hopkins University, while also becoming a faculty member at the Johns Hopkins Center for Clinical Trials, a position she holds to this day. During her second term as a joint associate professor, Diener-West became a member of the editorial board of the American Journal of Ophthalmology, a position she held from 1998–2004.

In 2000, Diener-West was given another joint appointment at Johns Hopkins University, however, this time, she was appointed as a full professor in the departments of Biostatistics and Epidemiology at Johns Hopkins Bloomberg School of Public Health. In 2004, Diener-West was appointed as the Inaugural Helen Abbey and Margaret Merrell Professor of Biostatistics Education, a position she has held to this day. In 2008, Diener-West was named as the chair of the Johns Hopkins Bloomberg School of Public Health's Master of Public Health program

== Research area ==
Diener-West states that her "research interests have focused on the design, conduct, and analysis of clinical trials." While working as the Study Statistician and Deputy Director of the Coordinating Center for the Collaborative Ocular Melanoma Study (COMS) at Johns Hopkins School of Medicine Diener-West co-published several articles concerning the project. The subject of these articles varied greatly, she published articles concerning: "Changing current practice: Implementing large multicenter trials for a rare condition", "Statistical methods for monitoring recruitment in a multi-center clinical trial.," "A Review of Mortality From Choroidal Melanoma II. A Meta-Analysis of 5-Year Mortality Rates Following Enucleation, 1966 Through 1988," and "Mortality after deferral of treatment or no treatment for choroidal melanoma."

Diener-West has also co-published a paper concerning the treatment of cystic fibrosis entitled "Evidence of CFTR function in cystic fibrosis after systemic administration of 4-phenylbutyrate." The study investigated the effects of an orally bioavailable short chain fatty acid called 4-phenylbutyrate, which "modulates heat shock protein expression and restores maturation of the deltaF508 [a mutation linked to cystic fibrosis] protein in vitro and in vivo," when given to subjects with cystic fibrosis. The authors concluded that the "short-term phase I/II study demonstrates proof of principle that modulation of deltaF508 CFTR biosynthesis and trafficking is a viable therapeutic approach for cystic fibrosis."

== Selected publications ==
- Diener-West, Marie (1994). "The VF-14 An Index of Functional Impairment in Patients With Cataract". Archives of Ophthalmology. 112 (5): 630–638. doi:10.1001/archopht.1994.01090170074026. PMID 8185520.
- Diener-West, Marie (1998). "Incident Chlamydia trachomatis Infections Among Inner-city Adolescent Females". JAMA. 280 (6): 521–526. doi:10.1001/jama.280.6.521. PMID 9707141.
- Diener-West, Marie (1999). "Effect of the Ownership of Dialysis Facilities on Patients' Survival and Referral for Transplantation". N Engl J Med. 341 (22): 1653–1660. doi:10.1056/nejm199911253412205. PMID 10572154.
- Diener-West, Marie (2009). "Clinical Information Technologies and Inpatient Outcomes A Multiple Hospital Study". Arch Intern Med. 169 (2): 108–114. doi:10.1001/archinternmed.2008.520. PMID 19171805.
- Diener-West, Marie (1989). "Identification of an optimal subgroup for treatment evaluation of patients with brain metastases using rtog study 7916". International Journal of Radiation Oncology, Biology, Physics. 16 (3): 669–673. doi:10.1016/0360-3016(89)90483-5. PMID 2646260.
