= Kay Dickersin =

American biologist and epidemiologist (1951–2026)

- Born: November 10, 1951; Philadelphia, Pennsylvania, U.S.
- Died: November 1, 2026 (aged 74); Exeter, New Hampshire, U.S.
- Occupations: Academic, researcher
- Known for: Research on publication bias, research on selective outcome reporting, strengthening research integrity, Cochrane Collaboration, consumer engagement in research

Academic background
- Education: Johns Hopkins University; University of California, Berkeley

Kay Dickersin (November 10, 1951 – November 1, 2026) was an American academic who trained first in cell biology and subsequently epidemiology. She went on to a career studying factors that influence research integrity, in particular publication bias and outcome reporting bias. Dickersin retired at the end of 2018 as Professor Emerita in the Department of Epidemiology at Johns Hopkins Bloomberg School of Public Health where she was Director of the Center for Clinical Trials and Evidence Synthesis there. She was also Director of the US Cochrane Center and the US Satellite of the Cochrane Eyes and Vision Group within the Cochrane Collaboration. Dickersin received multiple awards for her research.

== Education ==
Dickersin's formal academic and research training spans the basic, clinical, and public health sciences. Dickersin began an undergraduate degree at Bennington College in Bennington, Vermont, planning to major in art. After two years, she transferred undergraduate institutions to University of California, Berkeley. She received both a Bachelor of Arts and Master of Arts in Zoology (cell biology), from the UC Berkeley, in 1974 and 1975, respectively. She was awarded a PhD in epidemiology from the Johns Hopkins School of Hygiene and Public Health in 1989, with a dissertation titled Publication and the meta-analysis of clinical trials. While an undergraduate, she received a Howard Hughes Fellowship in Medical Research in 1971, and during her PhD research she received an NIH traineeship.

== Career ==
Dickersin spent two months in Dorothy and Claude A. Villee's research laboratory at Harvard University to complete a "field work term" at Bennington College. Her new interest in science led her to leave Bennington after 2 years, and to work in Allan Tobin's lab in developmental biology at Harvard College. Subsequently, she transferred undergraduate institutions to University of California, Berkeley. At Berkeley, where she did undergraduate and master's degree research, she worked in Daniel Mazia's lab. Her master's thesis was "Increased Permeability of Sea Urchin Eggs to Adenine After Fertilization, Parthenogenetic Activation, and Exposure to Ammonia". After her master's degree, Dickersin taught biology at two community colleges in California (West Valley College and Fullerton College) and subsequently worked in Roger Sloboda's lab at Dartmouth College doing developmental biology research.

While at Fullerton College, and through her biology students, Dickersin learned about the field of epidemiology, which she liked because it merges science with societal concerns and involves experimental research (clinical trials). In addition, in the late 1970s Dickersin believed the opportunities for women in laboratory research were limited. These two factors led her to switch research areas to public health, a field that she believed is more friendly to women. Dickersin matriculated at the Johns Hopkins School of Hygiene and Public Health in 1979, focusing on clinical trials, and Curtis L. Meinert became her advisor. Her graduate education was interrupted when the family moved to Boston for 4 years in 1981 so that her husband could attend medical school. During this interlude she worked with two influential mentors, Thomas C. Chalmers and Sir Iain Chalmers, and became interested in research synthesis and related biases. When she returned to Baltimore to complete her PhD, she worked on clinical trials as well as research directly linked to publication bias. Her PhD dissertation, "Publication and the Meta-analysis of Clinical Trials," was the first in her Department to use the model where a group of related published research papers is bound together with linking text, rather than the traditional model of a stand-alone document with chapters.

After completing her PhD in 1989, Dickersin moved to the University of Maryland, School of Medicine, in Baltimore, first to the Department of Ophthalmology and later to the Department of Epidemiology and Preventive Medicine. In 1998, she moved to Brown University School of Medicine where she launched the Center for Clinical Trials and Evidence-Based Healthcare. In 2005, she accepted a position directing the Center for Clinical Trials at Johns Hopkins Bloomberg School of Public Health in Baltimore, renamed in 2014 to the Center for Clinical Trials and Evidence Synthesis.

Dickersin's research career spanned several areas related to clinical trials and systematic reviews of trials. She has led clinical trials, for example she was principal investigator of two federally funded multicenter randomized trials, the data center for the Ischemic Optic Neuropathy Decompression Trial (IONDT) and the Surgical Treatments Outcomes Project for Dysfunctional Uterine Bleeding (STOP-DUB). Dickersin became interested in systematic reviews in the mid-1980s, especially the problem of identifying all relevant research on a topic. While her early research focused on establishing the existence of publication bias and the difficulty of retrieving the clinical trial literature, her later research has explored how selective outcome reporting may distort knowledge from clinical trials. She has also contributed to implementation of "fixes" related to these problems, aimed at increasing research integrity. For example, she has contributed to the establishment of clinical trial registries, promoting public accessibility to trial findings, and establishment of the Cochrane Collaboration in 1993.

Over the course of her career, Dickersin served on a variety of federal advisory committees, for example, she was appointed by President Clinton to the National Cancer Advisory Board (1994-2000). Internationally, she was instrumental in starting the World Health Organization's International Clinical Trials Registry Platform (ICTRP) and served as Co-Chair of the Scientific Advisory Group from 2005-2008 when it was disbanded. She has also served on numerous Institute of Medicine and National Research Council committees, which include for example: The Vaccine Safety Committee (1992-3); Committee to Advise the Department of Defense on its FY 1993 Breast Cancer Program (1993); Committee to Study the Reimbursement of Routine Patient Care Costs for Medicare Patients Enrolled in Clinical Trials (1998-9); Committee to Assess the System for Protecting Human Research Subjects (Advisory Consultant) (2001-2); Committee on the Review of Evidence on High Clinical Value Services (2005-7); Committee on Comparative Effectiveness Research Prioritization (2009); Committee for the Handling Missing Data in Clinical Trials (2009–10); Committee on Standards for Systematic Reviews of Clinical Effectiveness Research (2009–11).

== Cochrane collaboration ==
Dickersin was a founding member of the Cochrane Collaboration in 1993, and was on the Steering Committee from 1993 to 1996. She served on the Information Management Steering Group from 2003 to 2005. She directed the US Cochrane Center, which has evolved from one of four original centers (she headed the Baltimore Cochrane Center, the first US-based center, opening in 1994). She also directed the Cochrane Eyes and Vision Group, US Satellite, since its inception in 2002 and until June 30, 2018.

The US Cochrane Center coordinated the development of Cochrane's Central Register of Controlled Trials (CENTRAL) from 1994 to 2005, which was then turned over to The Cochrane Library publisher for further development and maintenance. Dickersin's papers related to the Cochrane Collaboration are at the National Library of Medicine.

In 2018, the US Cochrane Center at Johns Hopkins closed and Kay Dickersin stepped down from her position as its director.

== Consumer engagement in research ==
In 1986, one year after resuming her PhD work, Dickersin was diagnosed with invasive breast cancer. This led to her starting a breast cancer support group, Arm-in-Arm, with Marsha Oakley, and engagement in national and international consumer advocacy work, as a founding mother of the National Breast Cancer Coalition in 1991. Her papers related to the start of the NBCC are at the Schlesinger Library in Cambridge, Massachusetts. As the only scientist on the Board of Directors of the NBCC, Dickersin initiated a series of "teach-ins" for the Board designed to expose Board members to the underlying concepts in biology and epidemiology that they would need to be active contributors to the research agenda. Teaching faculty included Francis Collins and others. This project expanded in 1995 to Project LEAD, a flagship science education program offered by NBCC to consumer advocates and still active in 2014. Her longstanding support for consumer and patient engagement in the research process is also evident from her involvement in the Department of Defense (DoD) Breast Cancer Programme.

In 2003, Dickersin initiated a coalition of consumer and health advocacy groups (later named Consumers United for Evidence-based Healthcare or CUE. The idea behind CUE was to bring together consumer groups, who traditionally have not worked together, to form a professional organization for learning and networking. In addition to serving these functions, CUE helps scientist groups to identify consumers for meaningful engagement in research and on advisory and guideline panels.

== Personal life and death ==
Dickersin was married to Robert Van Wesep and had two sons and four grandchildren.

Dickersin died in Exeter, New Hampshire, on November 1, 2026, at the age of 74.

== Awards and honors ==
=== Research ===
- Frohlich Fellowship Award, New York Academy of Sciences, 1993 – 1997
- Elected to membership, American Epidemiological Society, 1999
- Elected to membership, Society for Research Synthesis Methodology, 2006
- Elected to membership, Institute of Medicine, 2007
- President, Society for Clinical Trials, 2008-2009
- Elected Fellow, Society for Clinical Trials, 2011
- Valkhof Chair, Radboud University Nijmegen Medical Centre, 2013
- Ingram Olkin Award for Lifetime Achievement in Research Synthesis Methods, 2014
- President, Society for Research Synthesis Methodology, 2016 – 2017

=== Consumer engagement/women's health ===
- "Woman of Excellence," National Association of Women Business Owners, Baltimore Regional Chapter, 1994
- Ellen Barnett Memorial Award, Susan G. Komen Foundation Race for the Cure, 1995
- Women's Hall of Fame, Baltimore City Commission for Women, 1996
- "Maryland's Top 100 Women," Daily Record, 1998, 2006
- MAMM magazine's "50 Who Made a Difference," 1998
- "Exceptional Advocate," National Breast Cancer Coalition, 2000
- "Contributions and Enduring Commitment to the Eradication of Cancer," American Association for Cancer Research, 2007

=== Teaching and mentoring ===
- Johns Hopkins Bloomberg School of Public Health Student Assembly, Advising, Mentoring, Teaching Recognition Award (AMTRA), 2009
- Johns Hopkins Bloomberg School of Public Health Student Assembly, Advising, Mentoring, Teaching Recognition Award (AMTRA), 2013
