= Screen pollution =

Screen pollution may refer to:

- The computer monitor as a component of electronic waste
- A colloquial reference to advertising and digital information pollution
- An anti-pattern in user interface design where excess, irrelevant information is displayed
