= Research Synthesis Methods =

- Discipline: Research methods Statistics
- Language: English
- Edited by: Dimitris Mavridis; Terri D. Pigott

Publication details
- History: 2010–present
- Publisher: Cambridge University Press
- Frequency: Bimonthly
- Impact factor: 6.1 (2024)

Standard abbreviations
- ISO 4: Res. Synth. Methods

Indexing
- ISSN: 1759-2879 (print); 1759-2887 (web)
- LCCN: 2010208799
- OCLC no.: 1016403985

Links
- Journal homepage; Online access, old volumes; Online archive; Online access, current volume

Research Synthesis Methods is a peer-reviewed multidisciplinary scientific journal covering all aspects of research methods as they have been applied to research synthesis. It was established in 2010 and is the official journal of the Society for Research Synthesis Methodology (SRSM). Until end of 2024, it was published by John Wiley & Sons on behalf of the SRSM. From 2025 on it is published by Cambridge University Press. The founding editors-in-chief were Christopher Schmid (Brown University) and Mark Lipsey (Vanderbilt University). The role of editor-in-chief went to Hannah Rothstein (Baruch College), Ian Shrier (Lady Davis Institute for Medical Research), Tasha Beretvas (University of Texas at Austin), and Gerta Rücker (Albert Ludwigs University of Freiburg, Germany). Currently, Terri D. Pigott (Georgia State University) and Dimitris Mavridis (University of Ioannina, Greece) act as editors. According to the Journal Citation Reports, the journal has a 2024 impact factor of 6.1, ranking it 5th out of 67 journals in the category "Mathematical & Computational Biology" and 18th out of 135 journals in the category "Multidisciplinary Sciences".

Despite the journal's stated inclusive disciplinary scope, commentators have noted that articles published in the journal tend to be focused on quantitative forms of research synthesis, such as meta-analysis, and to adopt a positivist perspective on the practice of research synthesis.
