= Cynthia Mulrow =

American physician (born 1953)

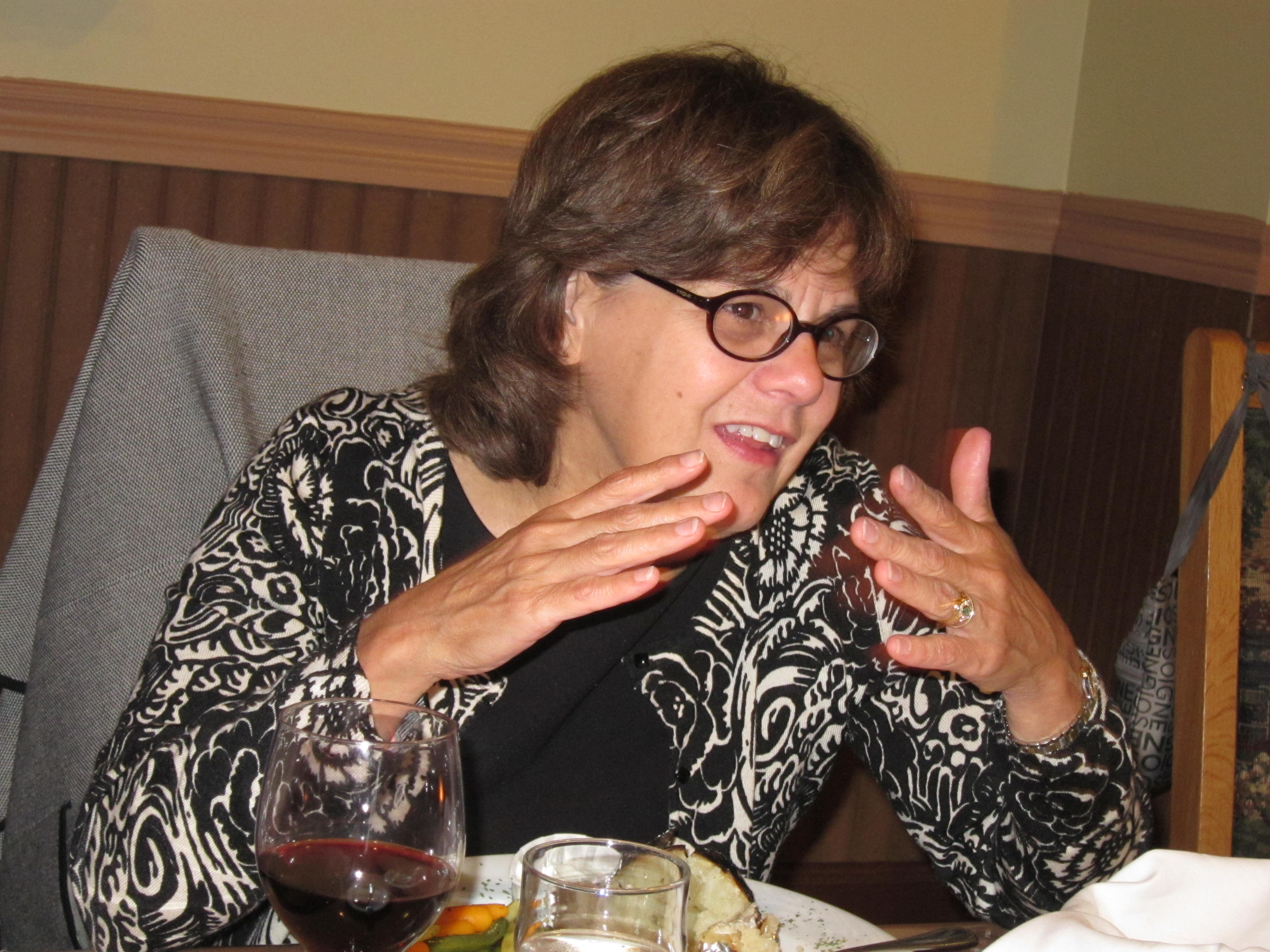
- Cynthia Mulrow, 2011
- Born: May 23, 1953 (age 73); Edinburg, Texas
- Education: Baylor College of Medicine (MD); Duke University School of Medicine; London School of Hygiene & Tropical Medicine
- Occupations: Physician, professor, researcher
- Known for: Research on systematic reviews, research methodology, and chronic conditions

Cynthia Mulrow (born May 23, 1953) is an American physician and scholar from Edinburg, Texas. She has regularly contributed academic research on many topics to the medical community. Her academic work mainly focuses on systematic reviews and evidence reports, research methodology, and chronic medical conditions.

== Education ==
Mulrow graduated from high school in, Alice, Texas. She received her MD degree from the Baylor College of Medicine in 1978, completed a fellowship in general medicine at Duke University School of Medicine in 1983, and a Masters in epidemiology at the London School of Hygiene & Tropical Medicine in 1984.

== Career ==
Mulrow is the Senior Deputy Editor of the academic journal, Annals of Internal Medicine, and an adjunct Clinical Professor of Medicine at the University of Texas Health Science Center at San Antonio. Past positions that she has held were: Program Director of the Robert Wood Johnson Foundation Generalist Physician Faculty Scholars Program (2000-2008) and Director of the San Antonio Cochrane Collaboration Center (1994-2000) and the San Antonio Evidence-based Practice Center (1997-2000). She was elected to the American Society for Clinical Investigation in 1997, honored as a Master of the American College of Physicians in 2005, and elected to the Institute of Medicine in 2008. She has authored numerous papers, including a seminal article on the medical review article in 1987, and has served on guideline panels including the United States Preventive Services Task Force. She currently contributes to groups who set standards for reporting research including PRISMA (systematic reviews and meta-analyses), and STROBE (observational studies).

== See also ==
- Preferred Reporting Items for Systematic Reviews and Meta-Analyses
