= William Shadish =

American psychologist (1949–2016)

- Born: William Raymond Shadish, Jr. November 3, 1949; Brooklyn, New York, US
- Died: March 27, 2016 (aged 66); Mariposa, California, US
- Education: Santa Clara University; Purdue University
- Alma mater: Purdue University
- Known for: Meta-analysis, Causal Inference
- Awards: Fellow of the American Psychological Association 1994 Paul F. Lazarsfeld Award for Evaluation Theory from the American Evaluation Association
- Scientific career
- Fields: Psychology, Statistics
- Institutions: University of California, Merced
- Thesis: The development, reliability, and validity of the Interpersonal Relations Scale: The measurement of intimate behavior with special application to encounter group outcome (1978)

William Raymond Shadish Jr. (November 3, 1949 – March 27, 2016) was an American psychologist and statistician who was a distinguished professor and founding faculty member at the University of California, Merced. He was known for his work in the field of behavioral science, especially on the topics of program evaluation, causal inference, meta-analysis, and the study of methodology.

== Early life and education ==
Shadish was born on November 3, 1949, in Brooklyn, New York, to William Shadish Sr. and Maryjane Cartmell. Shadish Jr.'s father was a Korean War veteran who spent 30 months as a prisoner of war in North Korea. Shadish Jr. was raised in Redding, California, and received his bachelor's degree in sociology from Santa Clara University in 1972. He went on to attend Purdue University, where he received his master's degree and Ph.D. in Clinical Psychology in 1975 and 1978, respectively.

== Career ==
After teaching at the University of Memphis for many years, Shadish joined the faculty of the University of California, Merced (UC-Merced) in 2003. There, he designed the psychology major at the then-brand-new university, which did not have any students or buildings when he first joined its faculty. He also led the process that created the Ph.D. in psychology program at UC-Merced. He became the second ever distinguished professor at UC-Merced, and received the Distinguished Research Award from their Academic Senate in 2011.

== Affiliations with learned societies ==
Shadish was the founding secretary-treasurer of the Society for Research Synthesis Methodology, later serving as its president from 2013 to 2014. He was also elected president of the American Evaluation Association in 1996, and of the Society of Multivariate Experimental Psychology in 2014. He was a fellow of the American Psychological Association.

== Awards ==
Shadish received the 1994 Paul F. Lazarsfeld Award for Evaluation Theory and the 2000 Robert Ingle Award from the American Evaluation Association. He also received two Outstanding Research Publication Awards (in 1994 and 1996) from the American Association for Marriage and Family Therapy, the 2002 Donald T. Campbell Award for Innovations in Methodology from the Policy Studies Organization, and the 2009 Frederick Mosteller Award for Lifetime Contributions to Systematic Reviews from the Campbell Collaboration.

== Death ==
Shadish died at his home in Mariposa, California, on March 27, 2016, of complications from prostate cancer.
