= Lisa Bero =

American scientist (born 1958)

Lisa Anne Bero
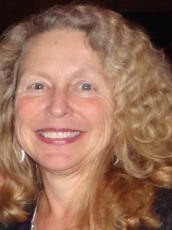
- Lisa Bero at the 21st Annual Cochrane Colloquium, Quebec, September 2013
- Born: Lisa Anne Bero; 4 August 1958 (age 68); New Orleans, Louisiana
- Education: Michigan State University; Duke University
- Known for: Research and policy on industry influence on research; Studying research integrity; WHO essential medicines; Cochrane Collaboration; The Cigarette Papers (1996)
- Scientific career
- Fields: Translating research into health policy; Research integrity; Essential medicines
- Workplaces: University of Colorado; University of Sydney; University of California San Francisco
- Thesis: The interaction of opioid and serotonergic systems regulation prolactin secretion in the developing rat (1987)

Lisa Anne Bero, born 1958, is an academic who originally trained in pharmacology and went on to a career studying research integrity and how clinical and basic sciences are translated into clinical practice and health policy. Bero is a Professor of Medicine and Public Health and the Chief Scientist of the Center for Bioethics and Humanities at the University of Colorado. She is also professor at the University of California, San Francisco.

Previously, she had been Chair of Medicines Use and Health Outcomes at the University of Sydney. From 1991 until 2014, she was Professor in the Department of Clinical Pharmacy (School of Pharmacy) and in the Institute of Health Policy Studies (School of Medicine) at the University of California, San Francisco (UCSF), and is currently an adjunct professor there. She is also Chair of the World Health Organization (WHO) Essential Medicines Committee, Director of the WHO Collaborating Centre for Pharmaceutical Research and Science Policy, and was Co-Chair of the Cochrane Collaboration from 2013 to 2017. Bero has received multiple awards for her extensive mentoring of high school students to junior faculty.

== Education ==
Bero gained a Bachelor of Science in physiology and philosophy from Michigan State University in 1980. She was awarded a PhD in pharmacology and toxicology from Duke University in 1987. She received a National Institute on Drug Abuse postdoctoral fellowship on the molecular basis of opiate addiction, but left basic research for health policy when she received a Pew Health Policy Fellowship in 1988, which included training in epidemiology.

== Career ==
A fellowship from the Pew Charitable Trust enabled her to make a transition from the basic sciences to health policy. Bero explained the impact of this on her career: "I do a lot of work on government committees and international committees. Had it not been for the Pew program I would have been a much more typical academic." She had a particular interest in the evidence basis for health practice and policy, often in controversial areas. She began researching both the evidence to improve prescribing, and the influence of the pharmaceutical industry on drug research, and going on to an interest in the tobacco industry's influence on research and policy. Her areas of research have since also included methods for assessing bias and quality of research and scientific publications, and the dissemination and policy implications of research.

Bero went on to advocate for policy changes at both policy and community levels, for example to end tobacco sales in San Francisco pharmacies. She is a co-author of The Cigarette Papers, a collection of documents published in 1996 that played a key role in litigation of tobacco companies. It has been called "the Pentagon Papers of tobacco."

After her postdoctoral position, Bero joined the faculty of the University of California, San Francisco (UCSF) where she was Professor in the Department of Clinical Pharmacy (School of Pharmacy), Professor in the Institute of Health Policy Studies (School of Medicine), and Vice-Chair for Research in the Department of Clinical Pharmacy until 2014. She served as Chair of the UCSF Chancellor's Advisory Committee on Conflicts of Interest.

Bero was a member of the Institute of Medicine Committee on Conflict of Interest in Medical Research, Education and Practice, which published its report in 2009. Along with Robert Krughoff and George Loewenstein, she co-authored a minority opinion entitled "Model for broader disclosure" (Appendix F) arguing that given the "serious limitations in the accuracy, completeness, comparability, and timeliness of conflict of interest information reported to institutions and to the public," the IOM recommendations did not go far enough. Their proposed model was based on the development of a database centralizing data on academics' potential conflicts of interest.

She was a senior editor of the journal Tobacco Control, and an editor for the Cochrane Effective Practice and Organisation of Care Group in the Cochrane Database of Systematic Reviews.

In 2014 Lisa was appointed the inaugural Chair of Medicines Use and Health Outcomes in the Faculty of Pharmacy and Charles Perkins Centre at the University of Sydney. She runs two research programs (Research Integrity and Science Policy and Improving Medicines Use for Noncommunicable Diseases in Low Resource Settings) on bias and its influence on the integrity of research. Her work spans basic science through to translation into policy:

1. Research Integrity and Science Policy: Professor Bero develops and validates innovative methods for assessing the source and extent of bias in the design, conduct and dissemination of research in human trials and observational studies, as well as animal studies. Her research takes account of the cultural, social, corporate, political and other influences on the design, conduct and publication of research and has a particular focus on producing unbiased evidence and promoting evidence-based decision making in studies on the prevention and treatment of obesity, diabetes and cardiovascular disease.

2. Improving Medicines Use for Noncommunicable Diseases in Low Resource Settings: Professor Bero is studying the assess barriers and facilitators to improve medicines use for noncommunicable diseases in low resource settings. This includes developing and testing interventions to improve essential medicines policy, supply, distribution and use.

== World Health Organization ==
Bero's first contact with the World Health Organization (WHO) occurred through her Pew Fellowship in the late 1980s. She has been first an advisor, then a member of the WHO Essential Medicines Committee since 2005, and is currently Chair. Bero has been a member of the Pan American Health Organization's (PAHO, WHO Regional Office for the Americas) Advisory Committee for Health Research (ACHR) since 2008.

In 2011, she became the foundation Director of the WHO Collaborating Centre for Pharmaceutical Research and Science Policy. The Centre's areas of work are pharmaceuticals (including essential medicines), health systems research and development, and research policy.

In 2011, the Cochrane Collaboration became a non-governmental organization in official relations with the World Health Organization (WHO), including a seat on the World Health Assembly. Bero is one of the Collaboration's two representatives for WHO.

== Cochrane Collaboration ==
Bero was an editor of the Cochrane Collaboration Review Group on Effective Professional Practice and Organization of Care from the late 1990s. She led the development of the Criticism Management System for the Cochrane Library, implemented in 1997.

Bero was the Director of the San Francisco Branch of the United States Cochrane Center from its original establishment as the San Francisco Cochrane Center in 1995, at which time she served with co-director Drummond Rennie, and later Co-Director of the US Cochrane Center. She served on the Collaboration Steering Group from 1996 to 2000, and again from 2004 to 2010. Bero was Co-Chair of the Collaboration from 2013 to 2017.

== Awards and honors ==
- Pew Health Policy Fellowship in 1988, a program of the Pew Charitable Trust.
- Distinction in Mentoring Award in 2009 by the Academic Senate of the University of California, San Francisco.
- Harold S. Luft Award for Mentoring in Health Services and Health Policy Research in 2009. She was the first recipient of this award by the Philip R. Lee Institute for Health Policy Studies at the University of California, San Francisco.
