= Anthony Grafton =

American historian (born 1950)

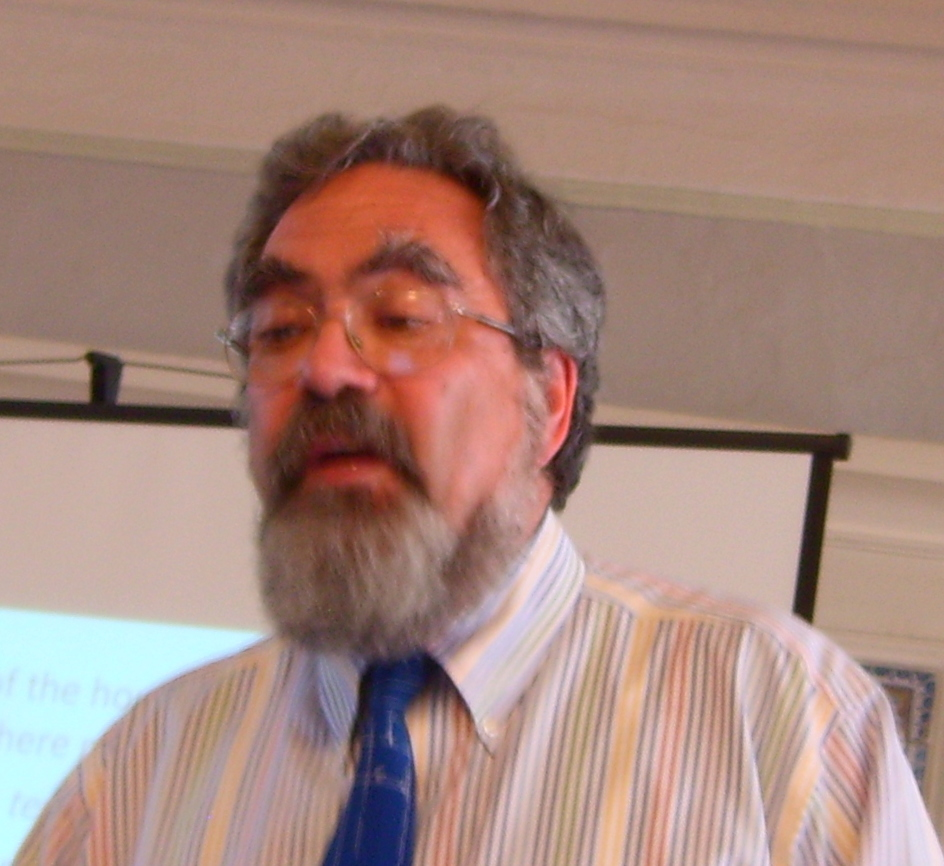
- Grafton in 2010
- Born: Anthony Thomas Grafton; May 21, 1950 (age 76); New Haven, Connecticut, US
- Spouse: Louise Erlich (m. 1972)
- Awards: Balzan Prize (2002)

Academic background
- Education: University of Chicago (BA, MA, PhD)

Academic work
- Discipline: History
- Sub-discipline: Early modern European history; historiography; history of science; intellectual history
- Institutions: Cornell University; Princeton University
- Doctoral students: Ann M. Blair; Brad S. Gregory; Carol Quillen
- Main interests: History of books

Anthony Thomas Grafton (born May 21, 1950) is an American historian of early modern Europe and the Henry Putnam University Professor of History at Princeton University, where he is also the director of the Program in European Cultural Studies. He is also a corresponding fellow of the British Academy and a recipient of the Balzan Prize. From January 2011 to January 2012, he served as the President of the American Historical Association. From 2006 to 2020, Grafton was co-executive editor of the Journal of the History of Ideas.

== Early life and education ==
Grafton was born on May 21, 1950, in New Haven, Connecticut. He was educated at Phillips Academy.

He attended the University of Chicago, from which he graduated with a Bachelor of Arts degree in history in 1971 and a Master of Arts degree in 1972. He made Phi Beta Kappa in 1970, with honors in history and in the college. After studying at University College, London, under ancient historian Arnaldo Momigliano, from 1973 to 1974, he earned his Doctor of Philosophy degree in history from the University of Chicago in 1975. He still retains links with the University of London's Warburg Institute.

Grafton married Louise Erlich in 1972, and was married to her until her death in 2019. They had two children.

== Career ==
After a brief period teaching at Cornell's history department, he was appointed to a position at Princeton University in 1975, where he has subsequently remained. In 2006, he became co-editor of the Journal of the History of Ideas, together with Warren Breckman, Martin Burke, and Ann Moyer.

== Works ==
Anthony Grafton is noted for his studies of the classical tradition from the Renaissance to the eighteenth century, and in the history of historical scholarship. His many books include a study of the scholarship and chronology of Renaissance scholar Joseph Scaliger (2 vols, 1983–1993), and, more recently, studies of Girolamo Cardano as an astrologer (1999) and Leon Battista Alberti (2000). In 1996, he delivered the Triennial E. A. Lowe Lectures at Corpus Christi College, Oxford, speaking on Ancient History in Early Modern Europe. Together with Lisa Jardine, he also co-wrote a revisionist account of the significance of Renaissance education (From Humanism to the Humanities, 1986) and on the marginalia of Gabriel Harvey.

He also penned several essay collections, including Defenders of the Text (1991), which deals with the relations between scholarship and science in the early modern period, and, most recently, Worlds Made by Words. His most original and accessible book is The Footnote: A Curious History (1997; originally published in German in 1995 as Die tragischen Ursprünge der deutschen Fußnote), a case study of how the marginal footnote developed as a central and powerful tool in the hands of historians.

He also writes on a wide variety of topics for The New Republic, The American Scholar, and The New York Review of Books. He owns a bookwheel which he keeps at hand in his home.

== Honors ==
- Los Angeles Times Book Prize, History, 1993
- Member of the American Philosophical Society, elected 1993
- Balzan Prize for History of the Humanities, 2002
- Member of the American Academy of Arts and Sciences, elected 2002
- Fellow of The British Academy, elected 1997
- Honorary degree from Leiden University, 2006
- Honorary degree from University of Oxford, 2013
- The Sigmund H. Danziger, Jr. Memorial Lecture in the Humanities, University of Chicago, 2011
- Rome Prize
- Pour le Mérite
- Guggenheim Fellowship
- Berlin-Brandenburg Academy of Sciences and Humanities

== Selected publications ==
=== Articles ===
- — (January 1, 2006). "The History of Ideas: Precept and Practice, 1950–2000 and Beyond" (PDF). Journal of the History of Ideas. 67 (1): 1–32. doi:10.1353/jhi.2006.0006. JSTOR 3840397. Archived from the original (PDF) on June 3, 2016.

=== Books ===
- Joseph Scaliger: A Study in the History of Classical Scholarship, Oxford-Warburg Studies (Oxford: Oxford University Press, 1983–1993).
- with Lisa Jardine, From Humanism to the Humanities. Education and the Liberal Arts in Fifteenth- and Sixteenth-Century Europe (London: Duckworth, 1986). ISBN 978-0-7156-2100-4
- Forgers and Critics. Creativity and Duplicity in Western Scholarship (Princeton: Princeton University Press, 1990).
- Defenders of the Text: The Traditions of Scholarship in the Age of Science, 1450–1800 (Cambridge, Massachusetts: Harvard University Press, 1991).
- Rome Reborn: The Vatican Library and Renaissance Culture (editor) (Washington: Library of Congress, 1993) ISBN 0-300-05442-4
- New Worlds, Ancient Texts: The Power of Tradition and the Shock of Discovery (Cambridge, Massachusetts: Harvard University Press, 1995).
- Commerce with the Classics: Ancient Books and Renaissance Readers (Ann Arbor: University of Michigan Press, 1997).
- The Footnote: A Curious History (Cambridge, Massachusetts: Harvard University Press, 1997).
- Cardano's Cosmos : The Worlds and Works of a Renaissance Astrologer (Cambridge, Massachusetts: Harvard University Press, 1999).
- Leon Battista Alberti: Master Builder of the Italian Renaissance (Cambridge, Massachusetts: Harvard University Press, 2000).
- Bring Out Your Dead: The Past as Revelation (Cambridge, Massachusetts: Harvard University Press, 2001).
- What Was History?: The Art of History in Early Modern Europe (Cambridge: Cambridge University Press, 2006).
- with Megan Hale Williams, Christianity and the Transformation of the Book: Origen, Eusebius, and the Library of Caesarea (Cambridge, Massachusetts: Harvard University Press, 2006).
- Codex in Crisis (New York: The Crumpled Press, 2008). Video: Anthony Grafton: Codex in Crisis on YouTube, February 12, 2009.
- with Brian A. Curran, Pamela O. Long, and Benjamin Weiss, Obelisk: A History (Cambridge, Massachusetts: Burndy Library and MIT Press, 2009).
- Worlds Made by Words (Cambridge, Massachusetts: Harvard University Press, 2009). Review by Véronique Krings, Bryn Mawr Classical Review 2009.09.32
- (with Joanna Weinberg), "I Have Always Loved the Holy Tongue": Isaac Casaubon, The Jews, and a Forgotten Chapter in Renaissance Scholarship (Cambridge, Massachusetts: Harvard University Press, 2011).
- Inky Fingers: The Making of Books in Early Modern Europe (Cambridge, Massachusetts: Harvard University Press, 2020).
- with Maren Elisabeth Schwab, The Art of Discovery: Digging into the Past in Renaissance Europe (Princeton University Press, 2022).
- Magus: The Art of Magic in the Renaissance from Faustus to Agrippa (Belknap Press, Harvard, 2023).
- with Blair, Ann; Duguid, Paul; Goeing, Anja-Silvia, eds. (2024). Information: A Short History. Princeton University Press. ISBN 9780691261553.

=== Essays ===
- — (September 22, 2022). "How to Cast a Metal Lizard". New York Review of Books. Vol. 69, no. 14.

Academic offices
Preceded by	E. A. Lowe Lecturer; 1996	Succeeded by Michael Reeve
Preceded by Page DuBois	Sigmund H. Danziger Jr. Memorial; Lecturer in the Humanities; 2010–2011	Succeeded by C. Brian Rose
Professional and academic associations
Preceded by Barbara D. Metcalf	President of the American Historical Association; 2011	Succeeded by William Cronon
Awards
Preceded by James S. Ackerman	Balzan Prize; 2002; With: Walter Jakob Gehring, Xavier Le Pichon, and Dominique Schnapper	Succeeded by Reinhard Genzel
Preceded by Jean-Pierre Changeux	Balzan Prize; 2002; With: Walter Jakob Gehring, Xavier Le Pichon, and Dominique Schnapper	Succeeded by Eric Hobsbawm
Preceded by Marc Fumaroli	Balzan Prize; 2002; With: Walter Jakob Gehring, Xavier Le Pichon, and Dominique Schnapper	Succeeded by Wen-Hsiung Li
Preceded by Claude Lorius	Balzan Prize; 2002; With: Walter Jakob Gehring, Xavier Le Pichon, and Dominique Schnapper	Succeeded by Serge Moscovici
