= Society for Research Synthesis Methodology =

Learned society focused on research synthesis

Society for Research Synthesis Methodology (SRSM)
- Formation: 2005; 21 years ago
- Type: Learned society
- Purpose: "to encourage the development of theory, and methods, and encourage rigorous applications in research synthesis and associated topics"
- Location: California
- Region served: worldwide
- Members: 85
- President: Ian Shrier
- Secretary: Hayley Jones
- Treasurer: Ian Saldanha
- Publication: Research Synthesis Methods
- Website: www.srsm.org

The Society for Research Synthesis Methodology (abbreviated SRSM) is an international, interdisciplinary learned society dedicated to promoting and fostering the study of research synthesis: the process whereby the results of multiple scientific studies are combined. It was founded in November 2005, with its organizational meeting held on November 11 and 12 of that year. It has 85 active members. Its official journal is Research Synthesis Methods, which has been published by Wiley since 2010. It holds annual meetings every summer for members (and occasionally nonmembers) to present their research. The president for the 2024–2025 term is Ian Shrier, and the president-elect is James Pustejovsky.

== Past presidents ==
- Terri Pigott (2023-24)
- Tianjing Li (2022–23)
- Georgia Salanti (2021–22)
- Jack Vevea (2019–21)
- Christopher H. Schmid (2018–19)
- Michael Borenstein (2017–18)
- Kay Dickersin (2016–17)
- Jessica Gurevitch (2015–16)
- Lesley Stewart (2014–15)
- William Shadish (2013–14)
- Hannah Rothstein (2012–13)
- Jesse Berlin (2011–12)
- David Jones (2010–11)
- John Ioannidis (2009–10)
- Larry V. Hedges (2008–09)
- Alex Sutton (2007–08)
- Betsy Becker (2006–07)
- Julian Higgins (2005–06)
