= Lesley Stewart =

Scottish academic (born 1963)

- Born: 27 May 1963 (age 63); Dundee, Scotland
- Education: University of Glasgow (BSc); University of York (MSc); University of East Anglia (PhD)
- Occupations: Researcher, professor
- Known for: Research on systematic reviews and meta-analyses

Lesley Ann Stewart (born 27 May 1963) is a Scottish academic whose research interests are in the development and application of evidence synthesis methods, particularly systematic reviews and individual participant data meta-analysis. She is head of department for the Centre for Reviews and Dissemination at the University of York and director for the N IHR Evidence Synthesis Programme. She was one of the founders of the Cochrane Collaboration in 1993. Stewart served as president of the Society for Research Synthesis Methodology (2013-2016) and was a founding co-editor in chief of the academic journal Systematic Reviews (2010–2021).

== Education ==
Stewart attended a state comprehensive school, leaving in 1980 to attend university. She graduated with a BSc in Zoology from the University of Glasgow in 1984, an MSc in Biological Computation (mathematics, statistics and computing relating to biological science) from the University of York in 1985 and a PhD in ecology from the University of East Anglia in 1988.

== Career ==
Stewart joined the Medical Research Council (MRC) Cancer Trials Office in Cambridge in 1988 to carry out an "overview" synthesizing individual participant data from randomized trials of chemotherapy in advanced ovarian cancer. She was therefore fortunate enough to be part of the early development of systematic review methods. In particular, with colleagues including Mike Clarke and later Jayne Tierney, she helped establish the methods and practical approaches of systematic reviews and meta-analyses of individual participant data (IPD). Stewart and Clarke were amongst the founding members of the Cochrane Collaboration and in 1993 Stewart, Clarke and Tierney established the Cochrane IPD meta-analysis methods group.

Stewart worked for the MRC for 17 years establishing a research programme in the Cancer Trials Office in Cambridge and subsequently (following a merger of two groups) in the MRC Clinical Trials Unit under the Directorship of Professor Janet Darbyshire. During this time with her research team she published many systematic reviews and IPD meta-analyses.

In 2006 she was appointed as professor and Director and Head of Department of the Centre for Reviews and Dissemination, a research department at the University of York, where alongside her role as Director she has maintained her research interests in systematic review methods and IPD.

Stewart has long standing interest in transparency and data sharing. For example, she has contributed to reporting standards for protocols and IPD meta-analysis. Whilst at the MRC she was responsible for launching the first completely open web based register of clinical trials, the UKCCCR of cancer trials. At CRD she instigated the development of PROSPERO the open access international prospective register of systematic reviews. She was able to bring these research strands together and be part of the YODA initiative's first project to provide independent re-analysis and synthesis of industry data.

Stewart was Co-editor in chief of the BioMed Central (BMC) journal Systematic Reviews (2010-2021). She also served on the National Institute for Health and Care Excellence (NICE) Highly Specialised Technologies Committee (2014-2022).

Stewart was one of the first cohort of National Institute for Health Research (NIHR) Senior Investigators (2008 – 2013). In 2013, she was elected to serve as president of the Society for Research Synthesis Methodology.

== Personal ==
Stewart lives in York with her husband Simon Thornton. They have two grown-up daughters.
