= Data Smog =

1997 book by David Shenk

- Author: David Shenk
- Language: English
- Publisher: HarperCollins
- Publication date: 1997

Data Smog is a 1997 book by journalist David Shenk and published by HarperCollins. It addresses the author's ideas on how the information technology revolution would shape the world, and how the large amount of data available on the Internet would make it more difficult to sift through and separate fact from fiction.

== Argument of the book ==
According to Data Smog, with the advance of technology, we have been able to progress in terms of society, economy, and even health. Communication is instantaneous, knowledge is abundant, and as humans we try to keep up with this expansion of data that continues to accumulate from around the world.

However, it is the overwhelming amount of information that is defined as data smog; "this unexpected, unwelcome part of our atmosphere, an expression for the noxious muck and druck of the Information age." The wealth of information is harming some because of sheer amount of it and rate of production: "The sheer volume of information which many of us are exposed to every day may actually impair our performance and add stress to our lives." In fact, according to statistics provided by Shenk, "In 1971 the average American was targeted by at least 560 daily advertising messages. Twenty years later, that number has risen six fold, to 3,000 messages per day."

It is argued that "Just as fat has replaced starvation as this nation’s number one dietary concern, information overload has replaced information scarcity as an important new emotional, social, and political problem." As per David Lewis, PhD in psychology, this attempt at consuming the majority of data, the result is what he calls "information fatigue syndrome." This term refers to the data smog that we encounter daily that ultimately interferes with our sleep, concentration, and even affecting our immune systems.

According to clinical psychologist Michelle Weil "the problems stem from people’s overuse or misuse of technologies and from technology’s ineffective presentation of information, researchers are finding."

== Neologism ==
In 2004, Shenk's original term "data smog" was added to the Oxford English Dictionary
