= Drummond Rennie =

American nephrologist (1936–2025)

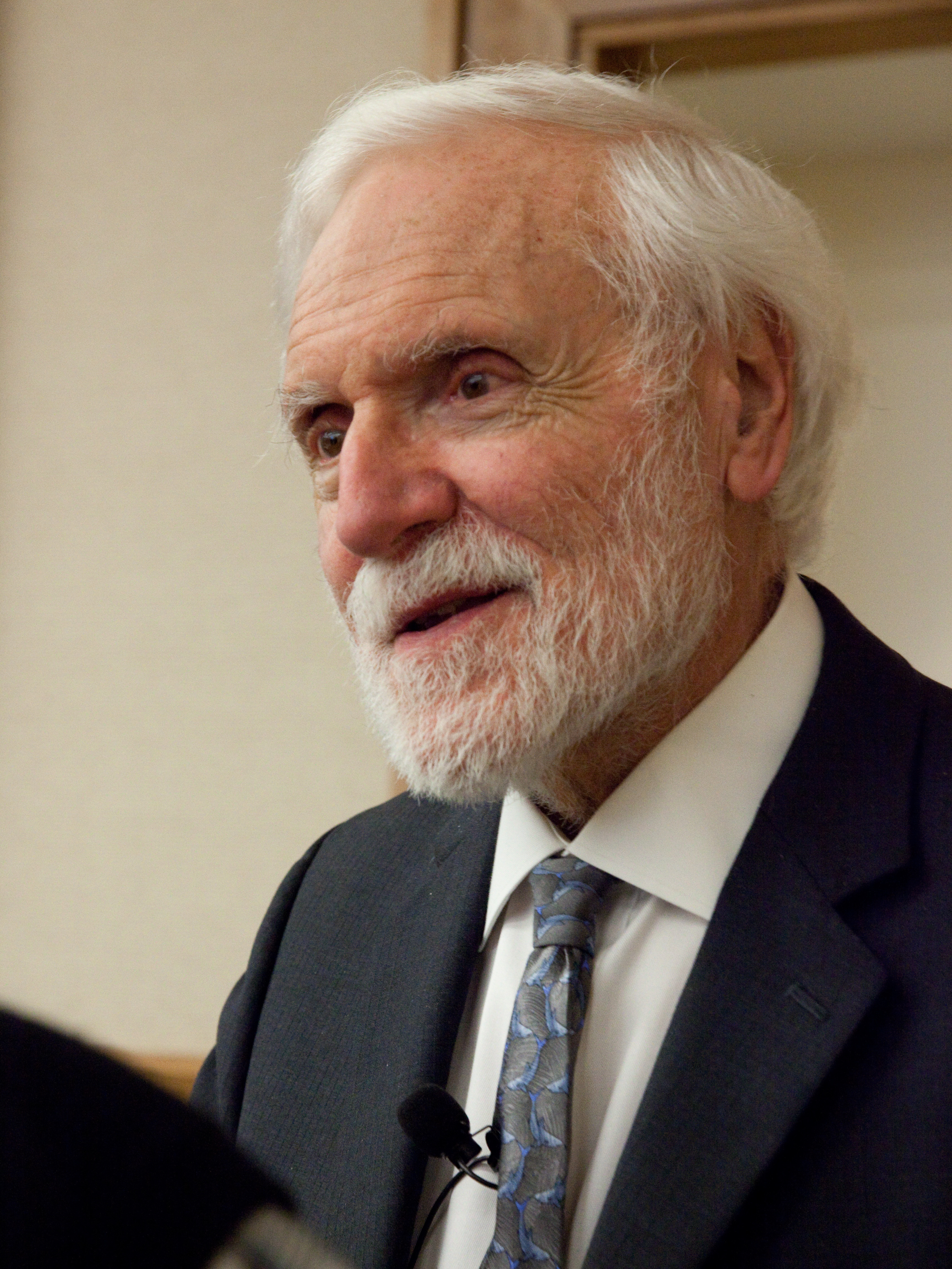
- Rennie in 2012
- Born: Ian Drummond Brownlee Rennie; January 31, 1936; Leeds, England
- Died: September 12, 2025 (aged 89); Medford, Oregon, U.S.
- Occupations: Nephrologist; physiologist; academic journal editor; professor of medicine
- Board member of: World Association of Medical Editors; Consolidated Standards of Reporting Trials
- Spouse(s): Silvia Nussio (m. 1958; div. 1984) Deborah Peltzman (m. 1992)
- Children: 2
- Awards: AAAS Award for Scientific Freedom and Responsibility (2008); Master of the American College of Physicians (2005)

Academic background
- Education: University of Cambridge; King's College London GKT School of Medical Education (M.D.)

Academic work
- Discipline: Nephrologist, physiologist
- Sub-discipline: High altitude physiology
- Institutions: University of California, San Francisco

Ian Drummond Brownlee Rennie (January 31, 1936 – September 12, 2025) was an American nephrologist and high altitude physiologist who was a contributing deputy editor of The Journal of the American Medical Association (JAMA) and an adjunct professor of medicine at the University of California, San Francisco.

Rennie was an editor of JAMAevidence, a project for education related to evidence-based medicine sponsored by the American Medical Association. He was known for involvement in reform of scientific publishing and for advocating improvements in reporting standards for clinical trials. He was the director of the first seven International Congresses on Peer Review and Biomedical Publication, which he also helped to develop along with JAMA.

In 2008, the American Association for the Advancement of Science awarded him its Award for Scientific Freedom and Responsibility.

== Background ==
Rennie was born on January 31, 1936, near Leeds in Yorkshire. He was a dual British-American citizen of Scottish and Danish American heritage.

Rennie married Silvia Nussio of Switzerland in 1958, with whom he had two children. They divorced in 1984, but maintained a friendship. He later married data scientist Deborah Peltzman in 1992, who survives him.

Rennie had physical health problems for some years until his death. He died from a stroke in Medford, Oregon, on September 12, 2025, at the age of 89.

== Career ==
Rennie attended Cambridge University and received his M.D. from Guy's Hospital Medical School. He became an editor at The New England Journal of Medicine in 1977 and later moved to The Journal of the American Medical Association. He described his first contact with serious scientific misconduct in publishing as arising less than four months into his editorship.

He organized the International Congress on Peer Review and Biomedical Publication (often known as the Peer Review Congress) for several years from 1989, a project he launched after receiving JAMA's support for the effort in 1986.

Along with Lisa Bero, Rennie served as the co-director of the San Francisco Cochrane Center, a predecessor institution to the United States Cochrane Center, which is a component of the international Cochrane Collaboration. He was president of the World Association of Medical Editors and a founding member of several efforts to improve and standardize the reporting of clinical trial data, most notably the Consolidated Standards of Reporting Trials (CONSORT) project.

== Awards and honors ==
Rennie was awarded a Mastership of the American College of Physicians in 2005. He received the 2008 AAAS Award for Scientific Freedom and Responsibility, cited "for his career-long efforts to promote integrity in scientific research and publishing", recognizing "his outspoken advocacy for the freedom of scientists to publish in the face of efforts to suppress their research."
