= Cochrane US Network =

The United States Cochrane Center (USCC) was one of the 14 centers on the world that facilitated the work of the Cochrane Collaboration. The USCC was the reference center for all 50 US states and US territories, protectorates, and districts: the District of Columbia, American Samoa, Guam, the Northern Mariana Islands, Puerto Rico, and the US Virgin Islands. The USCC was also the reference Center for the following countries: Antigua and Barbuda, Bahamas, Barbados, Belize, Dominica, Grenada, Guam, Guyana, Jamaica, Japan, Saint Kitts and Nevis, Saint Lucia, Saint Vincent and the Grenadines, and Trinidad and Tobago. The USCC discontinued on February 7, 2018.

== Historical overview ==
In the United States, there have been four Cochrane Centers since the start of the Cochrane Collaboration in October 1993. The Baltimore Cochrane Center was launched soon after the launch of the Collaboration, officially in 1994, with Kay Dickersin as Director. The San Francisco Cochrane Center was launched soon thereafter, in 1996, with Lisa Bero and Drummond Rennie as Co-Directors. The San Antonio Cochrane Center launched in 1994, with Cynthia Mulrow as Director, and the New England Cochrane Center launched in 1996 with Joseph Lau and Alexia Anczack-Bouckoms as co-Directors. In 1998, Kay Dickersin moved to Brown University in Providence, Rhode Island, and with the move the Baltimore Cochrane Center was renamed the New England Cochrane Center, Providence Office.

The US centers had variable luck with obtaining sufficient infrastructure funding, and The San Antonio Cochrane Center closed in 2000. In December 2002, the remaining three centers (the New England Cochrane Center at Boston, the New England Cochrane Center at Providence, and the San Francisco Cochrane Center) merged to form a single registered entity with three offices, the US Cochrane Center (the USCC). The Providence office became the first point of contact for the work of The Cochrane Collaboration in the United States and assumed responsibility for fulfilling the core Center functions.

In 2005, Kay Dickersin returned to Baltimore, to take up a post at Johns Hopkins University, and the USCC moved with her. The New England Cochrane Center Boston Office closed in February, 2008. In approximately 2006, Drummond Rennie moved out of the area, leaving his post as SF Branch Director, and Lisa Bero became the Center Director.

In June 2014, the San Francisco Branch of the United States (US) Cochrane Center changed its name to the West Coast Branch of the US Cochrane Center, and because of Lisa Bero's emigration to Australia, a new Branch Director was announced, Mark Helfand located at Oregon Health and Science University.

On February 7, 2018, the USCC closed its doors.

== Main Tasks ==
1. Supporting Cochrane entities with a coordinating base in the US or one of the countries serviced by the Center. These include: Review Groups, Fields, and Methods Groups.
2. Supporting new Cochrane Review Groups (CRGs), Fields, and Methods Groups who want to register with the Collaboration.
3. Supporting individuals who seek information about and participation in the work of the Collaboration.

== Offices ==
=== The USCC Main Office in Baltimore ===
The USCC main office in Baltimore was responsible for providing training and support for review authors, trials search coordinators (TSCs), review group coordinators (RGCs), editors, handsearchers, consumers, healthcare providers, policy makers, and others. In addition the main office of the USCC worked with international colleagues to provide training and support for others in the Collaboration who were responsible for training.

=== CENTRAL ===
Each Cochrane Center is responsible for a unique function within the Cochrane Collaboration. For twelve years (1994 to 2005) the Baltimore Cochrane Center, and subsequently NECC@P, was responsible for coordinating CENTRAL, The Cochrane Collaboration's central register of controlled clinical trials. CENTRAL was designed for use by members of the Collaboration's review groups and others performing systematic reviews. CENTRAL serves both as a repository for trial reports identified by members of the Collaboration and as a source of trial reports from which Review Groups build their specialized registers. In late 1992, work began on development of a register of reports of controlled trials for use in conducting systematic reviews. The first meeting was held and the eligibility criteria were decided at the Cochrane Workshop on "Building a Register of RCTs" at Green College, Oxford, United Kingdom, November 8, 1992 and was attended by Iain Chalmers, Carol Lefebvre and Kay Dickersin, among others. Definitions and eligibility criteria were decided then that continue to be used to this day.

Although the individuals interested in and key to the developments leading to international registers of randomized controlled trials were also leaders in the Cochrane Collaboration, a larger and more centralized group was felt to be a better location for a common resource. Accordingly, the U.S. National Institutes of Health and specifically the U.S. National Library of Medicine were approached about a partnership. The National Institutes of Health convened a meeting in December 1993 to consider the importance of registers of controlled trials for the promotion of evidence-based health care. One of the outcomes of that meeting was an agreement by National Library of Medicine to retag existing MEDLINE records of reports of RCTs and CCTs, identified by Cochrane collaborators and not already tagged as such, with the publication types (PTs) RANDOMIZED-CONTROLLED-TRIAL (RCT[PT]) and CONTROLLED-CLINICAL-TRIAL (CCT[PT]).

The USCC conducted the "MEDLINE Retagging Project" from 1994 to 2005 by submitting to MEDLINE all CCTs and RCTs it had identified that were not yet tagged RCT/PT or CCT/PT in MEDLINE. It identified these publications in two ways: (1) collecting on a quarterly basis all CCT and RCT reports newly identified via handsearching by the approximately 50 Cochrane review groups, and (2) identifying all CCTs and RCTs not already identified as such on MEDLINE using electronic search methods. CENTRAL was then created using two sources of information about published trial reports, periodic download of all records in MEDLINE tagged as RCT|PT and CCT|PT and submission of non-MEDLINE eligible citations (e.g., conference abstracts identified through handsearching) by the centers and review groups.

After 1994, when the new publication type tags were initiated, reports of trials missed by NLM's MEDLINE indexing grew smaller with each year and the NLM decided not to fund the retagging Program after 2005. For the 1994-2005 time period, CENTRAL was funded mainly by the National Library of Medicine, and also by the Centers for Disease Control and Prevention, The Packard Foundation, and the European Union Biomedical and Health Research Programmes I and II.

Some trials are still missed by the MEDLINE indexers however, and searches of other electronic bibliographic databases are required, so the effort to make CENTRAL a comprehensive database of studies possibly eligible for Cochrane reviews continues. Since 2005, development of CENTRAL has been conducted by Cochrane and John Wiley and Sons, publishers of The Cochrane Library.

=== Cochrane US - West ===
The Cochrane US - West Center operates out of Oregon Health & Science University and University of California, San Francisco. It develops guidance for systematic reviews of complex interventions and realist reviews of health policies, supports the production of high-quality reviews, and shares them with stakeholders on the west coast of the US to improve health decision making. The partnership is led by Director Jeanne-Marie Guise, MD, MPH, at OHSU, and Associate Director Dorie Apollonio, PhD, MPP, at UCSF. It is affiliated with the Pacific Northwest Evidence-based Practice Center, VA Portland Health Care System Evidence Synthesis Program, and Kaiser Permanente Center for Health Research Northwest, the Review Groups Cochrane Back and Neck Group and Cochrane Fertility Regulation Group, and with Oregon Health Authority and Oregon's Health Evidence Review Commission. Cochrane US - West works with the Wiki Education Foundation and students at the UCSF School of Pharmacy to improve the quality of health-related Wikipedia articles, updating approximately 30 articles annually with information drawn from recent systematic reviews.

=== The Caribbean Branch of the USCC (CBUSCC) ===
The CBUSCC is the reference center for English-speaking Caribbean territories. Its development extends the services available to Cochrane contributors already working in the Caribbean region and also supports new authors.

== Review Groups ==
=== Current ===
- Eyes and Vision Review Group (US Satellite) – Johns Hopkins Bloomberg School of Public Health - Systematic reviews of all the interventions use to prevent or treat eye diseases and/or visual impairment. We also consider the evidence for interventions that aim to help people adjust to visual impairment or blindness. We have a strategy for prioritization that emphasizes major causes of blindness in the world and areas where there are wide variations in clinical practice and outcomes.
- Cochrane Fertility Regulation - Oregon Health and Science University - Systematic reviews of fertility issues, such as contraception and unwanted pregnancy.
- Neonatal Review Group – Burlington, Vermont - Evidence-based, regularly updated reviews of the effects of therapies in neonatal-perinatal medicine.
- Cochrane Urology – Minneapolis VA Health Care System, the University of Minnesota Department of Urology - Systematic reviews of health care interventions for prostatic diseases, male sexual dysfunction, urology-related renal topics, and urologic cancers. On January 1, a Satellite Group was launched and it is based in South Korea Yonsei University in Wonju.

=== Former ===
- Heart Review Group (US Satellite) – Department of Preventive Medicine, Northwestern University Feinberg School of Medicine - Systematic reviews that support prevention, management and treatment of cardiovascular disease.
- HIV/AIDS Group (US Satellite) - (1999-2015)

== Fields ==
- Complementary Medicine Field
- Justice Health Field

== Methods Groups ==
- Comparing Multiple Interventions Methods Group – Focuses on methodology for comparing multiple interventions in Cochrane Intervention Reviews or Overviews. Cochrane Overviews aim to summarize the findings of multiple standard Cochrane reviews. Brings together expertise in network meta-analysis.
- Patient Reported Outcomes Methods Group – Advise Cochrane reviewers about when and how to incorporate patient reported outcomes into systematic reviews. Also seeks to refine methods of literature search, refine methods for meta-analysis, develop methods for systematically reviewing patient reported outcomes studies.

== Cochrane US Network affiliates ==
American College of Physicians.
