= Too Much to Know =

2010 book by Ann M. Blair

Too Much To Know: Managing Scholarly Information before the Modern Age
- Author: Ann M. Blair
- Language: English
- Subject: Information overload
- Genre: Non-fiction
- Publisher: Yale University Press
- Publication date: 2010
- Publication place: United States

Too Much To Know: Managing Scholarly Information before the Modern Age (Yale University Press, 2010) is a book by American intellectual historian Ann M. Blair. The book deals with the concept of information overload. Blair argues that the feeling of being overwhelmed by information is not unique to the digital age. Instead, it has existed since antiquity and in many cultures.

== Reception ==
The New Yorker named the book as one of the best books of 2011. It was also praised by the Washington Post, Rorotoko, and Times Higher Education.
