= Anthony DeCurtis =

American author and music critic (born 1951)

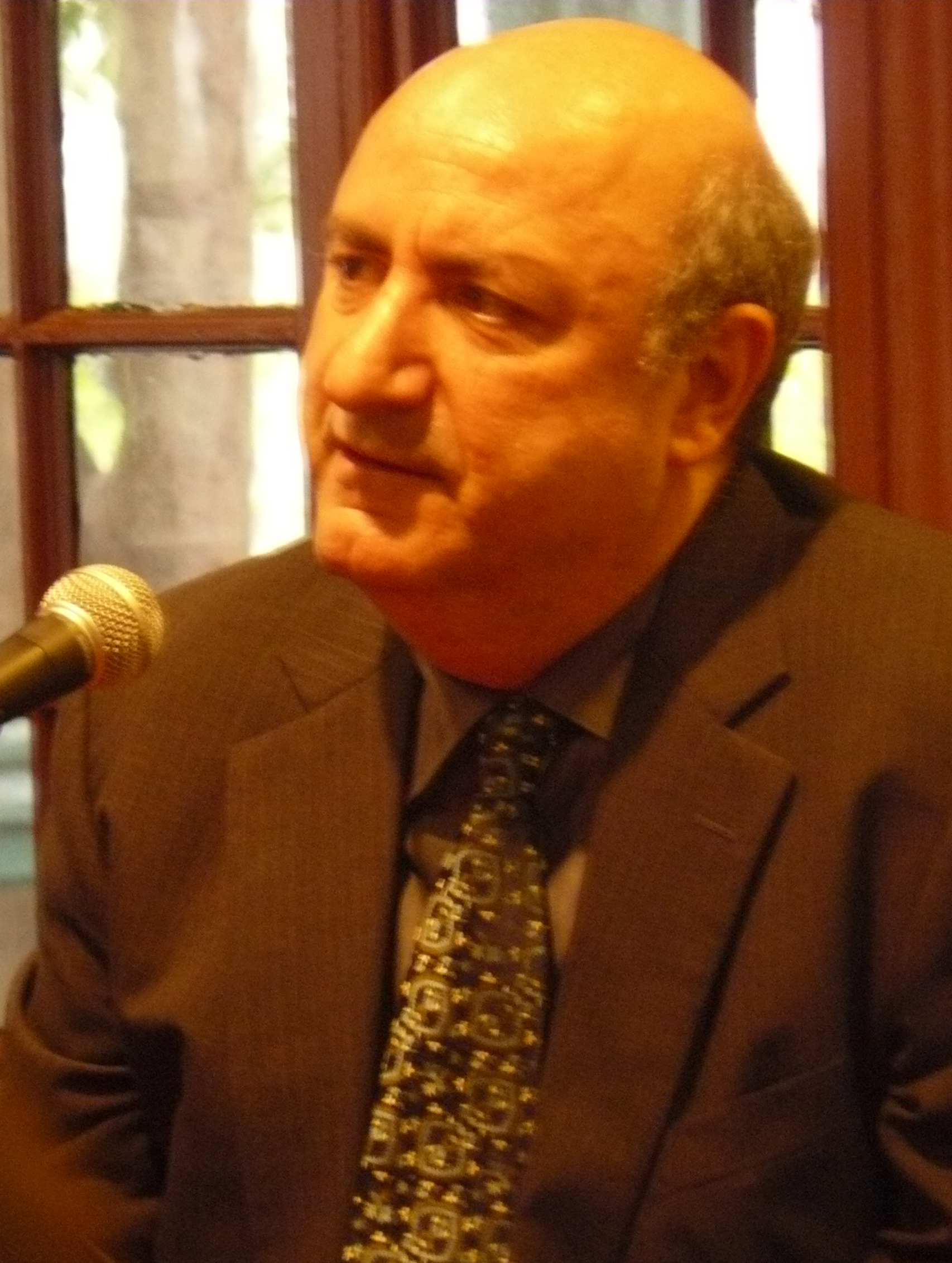
- DeCurtis in 2011
- Born: June 25, 1951 (age 75); New York City, New York, U.S.
- Occupations: Journalist; author; television personality; critic; columnist

Anthony DeCurtis (born June 25, 1951) is an American author and music critic, who has written for Rolling Stone, The New York Times, Relix and many other publications.

== Career ==
DeCurtis is a contributing editor at Rolling Stone, where his work has appeared for more than thirty years. He received a B.A. from Hunter College in 1974 and a Ph.D. in American literature from Indiana University Bloomington in 1981 and is a Distinguished Lecturer in the creative writing program at the University of Pennsylvania. He collaborated with Clive Davis on Davis's autobiography, The Soundtrack of My Life, which was published by Simon & Schuster in February 2013 and rose to number two on the New York Times nonfiction best-seller list. He appears in Clive Davis: The Soundtrack of Our Lives, a documentary based on the book that opened the Tribeca Festival in April 2017. His biography of Lou Reed, titled Lou Reed: A Life, was published by Little, Brown and Company on 10 October 2017.

DeCurtis's essay accompanying the 1988 Eric Clapton box set Crossroads won a Grammy Award in the "Best Album Notes" category, and on three occasions he has won ASCAP's Deems Taylor awards for excellence in writing about music. He has appeared as a commentator on MTV, VH1, the Today Show, and many other news and entertainment programs. In the 1990s, DeCurtis served as the moderator on the VH1 show Four on the Floor and as editorial director for the channel's nonfiction programming. He has served as a member of the Rock and Roll Hall of Fame nominating committee for more than twenty years.

From 2006 through June 2008, DeCurtis directed and helped design the arts-and-culture curriculum at the City University of New York Graduate School of Journalism. He was an editorial consultant and the primary interviewer for "Joan Baez: How Sweet the Sound," a documentary for the PBS series American Masters. DeCurtis appeared in the 2011 documentary Reggae Got Soul: The Story of Toots and the Maytals which was featured on BBC and described as “The untold story of one of the most influential artists ever to come out of Jamaica”.

In 2015, DeCurtis joined the judging panel of the 14th annual Independent Music Awards to assist independent musicians' careers. He was a judge for the 7th, 8th, 9th, 10th, 11th, 12th and 13th Independent Music Awards.

== Works ==
=== Author ===
- In Other Words: Artists Talk About Life and Work Milwaukee, WI : Leonard, 2005. ISBN 9780634066559, OCLC 218030781
- Rocking My Life Away: Writing About Music and Other Matters , Durham : Duke University Press, 1998. ISBN 9780822321842, OCLC 37519530
- Lou Reed : a life New York : Little, Brown and Company, 2017. ISBN 9780316376556, OCLC 1028612746

=== Editor ===
- Present Tense: Rock & Roll and Culture Durham, North Carolina : Duke University Press, 1991. OCLC 25498009; ISBN 9780822312659, OCLC 26095859
- Blues & Chaos: The Music Writing of Robert Palmer New York : Scribner, 2009. ISBN 9781416599753, OCLC 1007851432
- Rolling Stone Illustrated History of Rock & Roll Paw Prints 2008. ISBN 9781435262348, OCLC 226354611
- Rolling Stone images of rock & roll Boston, Massachusetts; London : Little, Brown and Company, 1995. ISBN 9780316754682, OCLC 470053045
- Anthony DeCurtis; James Henke; Holly George-Warren; et al., Rolling Stone Album Guide. New York: Random House, 1992. ISBN 9780679737292, OCLC 906594992
