= David Shenk =

American writer, lecturer, and filmmaker

- Education: Brown University
- Occupations: Writer, lecturer, songwriter, author

David Shenk is an American writer, lecturer, and songwriter.

He has contributed to National Geographic, Slate, The New York Times, Gourmet, Harper's, Wired, The New Yorker, The New Republic, The Nation, The American Scholar, NPR, and PBS. In mid-2009, he joined The Atlantic as a correspondent. Shenk graduated from Brown University in 1988.

Shenk was also a panelist on the VH1 music review television series Four on the Floor.

== Books ==
Shenk has published the following books:

- Skeleton Key: A Dictionary For Deadheads (1994) (Co-written with Steve Silberman)
- Data Smog: Surviving the Information Glut (1997)
- The End of Patience: More Notes of Caution on the Information Revolution (1999)
- The Forgetting: Alzheimer's, Portrait of An Epidemic (2001)
- The Immortal Game: A History of Chess (2006)
- The Genius In All Of Us: Why Everything You've Been Told About Genetics, Talent, and IQ Is Wrong (2010)

== Films ==
In 2004, PBS broadcast the Emmy award-winning "The Forgetting," which was inspired by Shenk's book of the same name. The film was directed by Elizabeth Arledge. Shenk appeared in the film and served as a writer and consultant.

In 2006, "The Forgetting" was featured on-screen and read aloud in the Sarah Polley film Away From Her. Polley said that the book was "hugely influential" to her in making the film.

In 2007, Shenk wrote, produced and directed four short films on Alzheimer's disease.

== Awards and honors ==
- 1995: Fellow, Freedom Forum Media Studies Center at Columbia University
- 1997: Finalist, McGannon Award for Social and Ethical Relevance in Communication Policy
- 1998: Fellow, The Japan Society
- 2000: Named one of "10 Masters of the New Economy" by CIO magazine.
- 2001: The Forgetting awarded First Prize, British Medical Association's Popular Medical Book Awards
- 2004: Shenk's original term "data smog" added to the Oxford English Dictionary
- 2006: The Immortal Game picked as a Globe and Mail Top Book of 2006 and Toronto Star Top 100 Book of 2006
