= David Adleson =

American music critic, journalist and writer

- Born: United States
- Occupations: Music critic, journalist, writer, television personality

David Adleson is an American music critic, journalist and writer and has served as a producer and music correspondent for E! News since 1992, reporting on music trends, events and issues, Adleson was also a panelist on the VH1 series Four on the Floor.
