= Christopher H. Schmid =

American biostatistician

Christopher H. Schmid is a Professor of Biostatistics and chair of the Department of Biostatistics at the Brown University School of Public Health. Schmid was a founding member formerly Co-Director of Brown's Center for Evidence Synthesis in Health.

Schmid grew up in Bethesda, Maryland. He earned a bachelor of arts in mathematics from Haverford College and a Ph.D. in statistics from Harvard University. After receiving his doctorate, he joined Tufts-New England Medical Center where he worked on predictive models for patients who had heart attacks and were candidates for thrombolysis. Schmid remained at Tufts from 1991 to 2012 ultimately directing the Biostatistics Research Center, at the Institute for Clinical Research and Health Policy Studies. In 2012, he moved to Brown University, where he co-founded the Center for Evidence Synthesis in Health with Joseph Lau and Tom Trikalinos.

Schmid has been a fellow of the American Statistical Association since 2010 and chaired the Health Policy Statistics Section of the ASA in 2013. He served as president of the Society for Research Synthesis Methodology from 2018 to 2019.
