= Four on the Floor (American TV program) =

- Genre: Rock music reviews
- Starring: Anthony DeCurtis; Amy Linden; Scott Poulson-Bryant; J. D. Considine; David Adleson; David Shenk
- Country of origin: United States
- Original language: English

Original release
- Network: VH1
- Release: 1994 – 1996

Four on the Floor is an American television program that aired on VH1 from 1994 to 1996. It was hosted by a panel of music critics who discussed the latest new releases. The program was nominated for a Cable Ace Award.

Anthony DeCurtis was the program's moderator, panelists included Vibe magazine's Scott Poulson-Bryant, Amy Linden, J.D. Considine, David Adleson and David Shenk.
