= Scott Poulson-Bryant =

American journalist and author

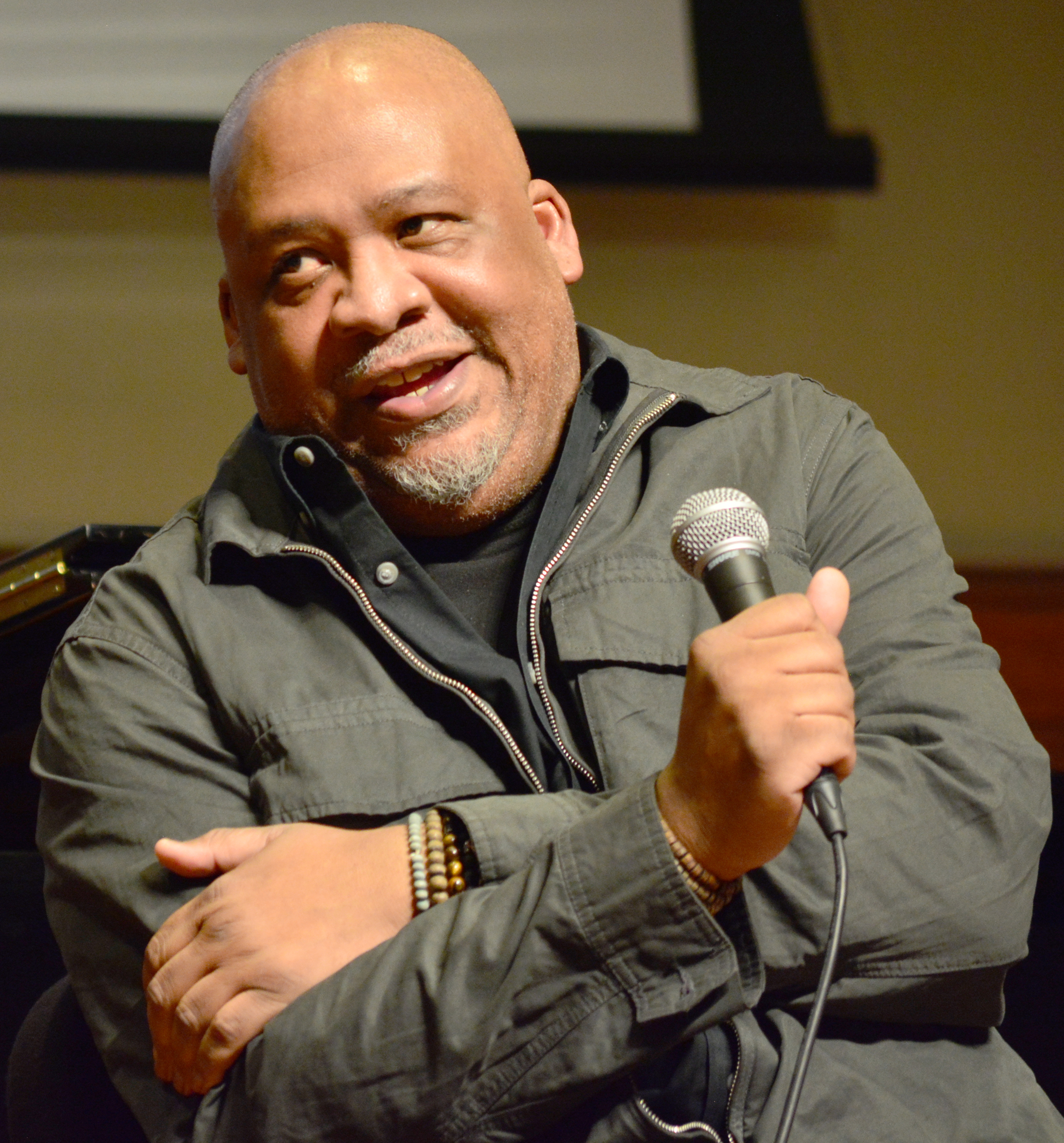
- Scott Poulson-Bryant, 2025
- Born: United States
- Occupations: Music critic, writer, journalist, academic

Scott Poulson-Bryant is an American journalist and author. One of the co-founding editors of Vibe magazine in 1992 (and the editor who gave the magazine its name), Poulson-Bryant's journalism, profiles, reviews, and essays have appeared in such publications as the New York Times, the Village Voice, Rolling Stone, Spin, Essence, Ebony, and The Source. He is the author of HUNG: A Meditation on the Measure of Black Men in America (published by Doubleday Books in 2006) and a novel called The VIPs.

== Early life and education ==
Poulson-Bryant was born and raised in Long Island, New York. He received his Bachelor of Arts degree from Brown University (2008, though he was originally in the Class of 1988). He recently completed his PhD in American Studies at Harvard University and was a tutor in Kirkland House. He has joined the faculty of Fordham University and will start teaching fall 2016.

== Career ==
Most notable for covering trends in urban youth and popular culture, Poulson-Bryant's 1988 Village Voice cover story about Voguing was the first national coverage of the cultural phenomenon. His ground-breaking VIBE profiles of Sean "Puff Daddy" Combs (1992) and De La Soul (1993) won the ASCAP Deems Taylor Awards for Excellence in Music Journalism. His Puff Daddy profile also won the Best Feature Writing award from New York chapter of the National Association of Black Journalists. Before helping to launch VIBE, he was a staff writer at SPIN, and from 2006–2008, he was editorial director of GIANT Magazine.

Poulson-Bryant has profiled and written cover stories on such media notables as Janet Jackson, Will Smith, Prince, Beyoncé, Eminem, Quincy Jones, R. Kelly, Eddie Murphy, Usher, Lenny Kravitz, Bobby Brown, Chloë Sevigny, Public Enemy, Ice Cube, LL Cool J, Jennifer Hudson, Dennis Rodman, Shaquille O'Neal, Mike Tyson, Pam Grier, Tyson Beckford, Scottie Pippen, Regina Belle, Jody Watley, Boyz II Men, Martin Lawrence, and many others. From 1994 to 1996, he was a panelist on VH1's weekly music roundtable show Four on the Floor.

His short stories and articles have been anthologized in And It Don't Stop: The Best American Hip-Hop Journalism of the Last 25 Years, Kevin Powell's Step into a World: A Global Anthology of the New Black Literature, Marita Golden and E. Lynn Harris' GUMBO, and Rachel Kramer Bussell's Best Sex Writing 2008.

In 2008–09, he taught journalism at Brown University, in Providence, Rhode Island.

== Works ==
(2002) What's Your Hi-Fi Q: 30 Years of Black Music Trivia (with Smokey Fontaine)
(2006) HUNG: A Meditation on the Measure of Black Men in America
(2010) The VIPs (a novel)
