= Information pollution =

Contamination of information supply

An anti-misinformation campaign against COVID-19 misinformation by the World Health Organization

Information Pollution (also referred to as info pollution) is the contamination of an information supply with irrelevant, redundant, unsolicited, hampering, and low-value information. Examples include misinformation, disinformation, junk e-mail, and media violence.

The spread of useless and undesirable information can have a detrimental effect on human activities. It is considered to be an adverse effect of the information revolution.

== Overview ==
Information pollution generally applies to digital communication, such as e-mail, instant messaging (IM), and social media. The term acquired particular relevance in 2003 when web usability expert Jakob Nielsen published articles discussing the topic. As early as 1971 researchers were expressing doubts about the negative effects of having to recover "valuable nodules from a slurry of garbage in which it is a randomly dispersed minor component." People use information in order to make decisions and adapt to circumstances. Cognitive studies demonstrated human beings can process only limited information before the quality of their decisions begins to deteriorate. Information overload is a related concept that can also harm decision-making. It refers to an abundance of available information, without respect to its quality.

Although technology is thought to have exacerbated the problem, it is not the only cause of information pollution. Anything that distracts attention from the essential facts required to perform a task or make a decision could be considered an information pollutant.

Information pollution is seen as the digital equivalent of the environmental pollution generated by industrial processes. Some authors claim that information overload is a crisis of global proportions, on the same scale as threats faced by environmental destruction. Others have expressed the need for the development of an information management paradigm that parallels environmental management practices.

== Manifestations ==
The manifestations of information pollution can be classified into two groups: those that provoke disruption, and those that damage information quality.

Typical examples of disrupting information pollutants include unsolicited electronic messages (spam) and instant messages, particularly in the workplace. Mobile phones (ring tones and content) are disruptive in many contexts. Disrupting information pollution is not always technology based. A common example are newspapers, where subscribers read less than half or even none of the articles provided. Superfluous messages, such as unnecessary labels on a map, also distract.

Alternatively, information may be polluted when its quality is reduced. This may be due to inaccurate or outdated information, but it also happens when information is badly presented. For example, when content is unfocused or unclear or when they appear in cluttered, wordy, or poorly organised documents it is difficult for the reader to understand.

Laws and regulations undergo changes and revisions. Handbooks and other sources used for interpreting these laws can fall years behind the changes, which can cause the public to be misinformed.

== Causes ==
=== Cultural factors ===
Traditionally, information has been seen positively. People are accustomed to statements like "you cannot have too much information", "the more information the better", and "knowledge is power". The publishing and marketing industries have become used to printing many copies of books, magazines, and brochures regardless of customer demand, just in case they are needed.

Democratised information sharing is an example of a new technology that has made it easier for information to reach everyone. Such technologies are perceived as a sign of progress and individual empowerment, as well as a positive step to bridge the digital divide. However, they also increase the volume of distracting information, making it more difficult to distinguish valuable information from noise. The continuous use of advertising in websites, technologies, newspapers, and everyday life is known as "cultural pollution".

=== Information technology ===
Technological advances of the 20th century and, in particular, the internet play a key role in the increase of information pollution. Blogs, social networks, personal websites, and mobile technology all contribute to increased "noise". The level of pollution may depend on the context. For example, e-mail is likely to cause more information pollution in a corporate setting, whereas mobile phones are likely to be particularly disruptive in a confined space shared by multiple people, such as a train carriage.

== Effects ==
The effects of information pollution can be seen at multiple levels.

=== Individual ===
At a personal level, information pollution affects individuals' capacity to evaluate options and find adequate solutions. This can lead to information overload, anxiety, decision paralysis, and stress. It can disrupt the learning process.

=== Society ===
Some authors argue that information pollution and information overload can cause loss of perspective and moral values. This argument may explain the indifferent attitude that society shows toward topics such as scientific discoveries, health warnings, or politics. Pollution makes people less sensitive to headlines and more cynical toward new messages.

=== Business ===
Information pollution contributes to information overload and stress, which can disrupt the kinds information processing and decision-making needed to complete tasks at work. This leads to delayed or flawed decisions, which can translate into loss of productivity and revenue as well as an increased risk of critical errors.

== Solutions ==
Proposed solutions include management techniques and refined technology.

- Technology-based alternatives include decision support systems and dashboards that enable prioritisation of information. Technologies that create frequent interruptions can be replaced with less-"polluting" options. Further, technology can improve the presentation quality, aiding understanding.
- E-mail usage policies and information integrity assurance strategies can help. Time management and stress management can be applied; these solutions would involve setting priorities and minimising interruptions. Improved writing and presentation practices can minimise information pollution effects on others.

== Related terms ==
The term infollution or informatization pollution was coined by Dr. Paek-Jae Cho, former president & CEO of KTC (Korean Telecommunication Corp.), in a 2002 speech at the International Telecommunications Society (ITS) 14th biennial conference to describe any undesirable side effect brought about by information technology and its applications.

== See also ==
- Digital divide
- Enshittification
- Information ecology
- Information explosion
- Information filtering system
- Information overload
- Information quality
- Information revolution
- Information society
- Information superhighway
- Informatization
- Signal-to-noise ratio
- Spam (electronic)
- Stress management
- Time management
