= Kazi Mostak Gausul Hoq =

Bangladeshi academician and writer

- কাজী মোস্তাক গাউসুল হক
- Born: 1 January 1974 (age 52); Feni District, Bangladesh
- Other name: Mostak Sharif
- Citizenship: Bangladesh
- Education: University of Dhaka
- Occupations: Academic, researcher
- Known for: Author, librarian

Kazi Mostak Gausul Hoq (pen name Mostak Sharif, born 1 January 1974) is a Bangladeshi author, academic, researcher and librarian. He is a professor in Department of Information Science and Library Management at University of Dhaka. He is known for writing books on library and information science as well as fiction, history, literature and technology. He has also translated several internationally known literary works into Bengali. Since February 2025, he has served as the Librarian (in-charge) of University of Dhaka Library. He has published more than forty books.

== Early life and education ==
Hoq was born on 1 January 1974 in Feni District. His father was Kazi Mozammel Hoq and mother Momtaz Mohal Begum. He studied Information Science and Library Management at University of Dhaka. He completed his bachelor's degree in 1994 and his master's degree in 1995, earning First Class First position in both examinations. He received a PhD from the University of Dhaka in 2012. His doctoral research focused on information systems for rural development in Bangladesh.

== Career ==
He began his professional career in 1999 at Community Development Library (CDL), where he worked in research, publications and development communication. In 2000, he joined East West University as a librarian and later became involved in developing its web-based integrated library automation system. Later he joined the Department of Information Science and Library Management at University of Dhaka as a part-time faculty member in 2000. He became a lecturer in 2003, assistant professor in 2007, associate professor in 2012 and professor in 2016. Since 2017, he has also served as an adjunct faculty member at East West University.

In February 2025, Hoq was appointed Librarian (in-charge) of University of Dhaka Library. He has also served as Associate Editor of Dhaka University Studies since 2019. Earlier, he was Associate Editor of the Arts Faculty Journal from 2013 to 2018.

=== Writing career ===
Besides his academic work, Hoq is an established author. He has written textbooks on library and information science, including works on information services, library automation, knowledge management and the relationship between society and libraries. These books are used as textbooks at several universities and institutes in Bangladesh. Writing under the pen name Mostak Sharif, he has published more than forty books, including novels, short story collections and books on history, literature and technology. Hoq is also a literary translator. He has translated several well-known English-language novels into Bengali, including The Bell Jar by Sylvia Plath, The Color Purple by Alice Walker, The White Book by Han Kang and Orbital by Samantha Harvey.

=== Research ===
Hoq's research focuses on library and information science, knowledge management, information literacy, digital libraries, rural information services, information ethics and academic libraries. He has published numerous research papers in national and international journals and conference proceedings. His work has also examined the role of libraries in digital transformation and the use of artificial intelligence in academic libraries.

== Selected works ==
=== Academic books ===
- Ekush Shataker Prekhyapote Reference O Tathysheba (Reference and Information Services in the perspective of the 21st century), a textbook written jointly with Md. Nazmul Hasan and published in 2016.
- Bibortoner Dharay Samaj, Tathya O Gronthagar (Society, Information and Libraries in the Stream of Evolution), a textbook written in Bangla published by Community Development Library (CDL), in November 2008.
- Tatthya Pratishthaner Shayangkriyakaran (Automation of Information Institutions), a textbook written in Bangla published by Knowledge Rain, Dhaka. 1st Edition: September 2007, 2nd Edition: June 2011.
- Gyan Bebosthapana (Knowledge Management), a textbook written in Bangla publish by Muktabhash in April 2017.

=== Selected translations ===
- The Bell Jar by Sylvia Plath
- The Color Purple by Alice Walker
- The White Book by Han Kang
- Orbital by Samantha Harvey

== Professional memberships ==
Hoq is a member of several professional organizations, including:

- Asiatic Society Bangladesh
- Library Association of Bangladesh (LAB)
- Bangladesh Association for Librarians, Information Scientists and Documentalists (BALID)
