= Systematic Reviews (journal) =

- Discipline: Science, Medicine
- Language: English
- Edited by: David Moher, Paul G. Shekelle, Lesley A. Stewart

Publication details
- History: 2012-present
- Publisher: BioMed Central
- Frequency: Upon acceptance
- Open access: Yes
- License: Creative Commons Attribution License 4.0

Standard abbreviations
- ISO 4: Syst. Rev.

Indexing
- ISSN: 2046-4053
- LCCN: 2012243325
- OCLC no.: 781439840

Links
- Journal homepage; Online access

Systematic Reviews is an online-only open access peer-reviewed medical journal published by BioMed Central that focuses on systematic reviews. Articles are either about specific systematic reviews, reporting their protocols, methodologies, findings, follow-up, etc., or else they are about such reviews as a class, discussing the science of systematic reviews.

The three editors-in-chief laid out their approach in the journal's first article. Among its goals, Systematic Reviews aims to provide comprehensive and up to date evidence for patient management, informing health policy, and developing rigorous practice guidelines.

== Abstracting and indexing ==
The journal is abstracted and indexed in Embase, Index Medicus/MEDLINE/PubMed, and Scopus.
