= Ann M. Blair =

American historian (born 1961)

- Born: 1961 (age 64–65)
- Education: Harvard University; University of Cambridge; Princeton University.
- Scientific career
- Fields: Historian
- Workplaces: Harvard University
- Thesis: Restaging Jean Bodin: the Universae Naturae Theatrum (1596) in its cultural context (1990)
- Doctoral advisor: Anthony Grafton

Ann M. Blair (born 1961) is an American historian, and the Carl H. Pforzheimer University Professor at Harvard University. She specializes in the cultural and intellectual history of early modern Europe (16th-17th centuries), with an emphasis on France. Her interests include the history of the book and of reading, the history of the disciplines and of scholarship, and the history of interactions between science and religion. She is widely known for her bestselling book, Too Much to Know: Managing Scholarly Information before the Modern Age (2010). Blair was elected to the American Philosophical Society in 2009. She also serves on the Editorial Board of the Journal of the History of Ideas.

== Early career ==
Blair studied at Harvard University, the University of Cambridge and Princeton University. At Princeton, she was the second graduate student of Anthony Grafton. She defended a dissertation entitled 'Restaging Jean Bodin: the Universae Naturae Theatrum (1596) in its cultural context' in 1990, which became the basis of her 1997 book.

== Professor ==
Since 1996, she has taught at Harvard University. She was named a Harvard College Professor in 2009 for outstanding undergraduate teaching, and has received numerous teaching awards since then, including the Harvard Phi Beta Kappa Teaching Prize for 2018. She received the Everett Mendelsohn Excellence in Mentoring Award in 2014. Four seniors for whom Blair was adviser won the Hoopes Prize for outstanding senior thesis, a prize that Blair herself won when a student at Harvard College.

== Major awards ==
- 2002 MacArthur Fellows Program
- 2014 Guggenheim Fellowship
- 2019 Panizzi Lectures
- 2022-2023 Lyell Readership in Bibliography
- 2023 Honorary doctorate from the University of Fribourg (Switzerland)

== Publications ==
=== Books ===
- (ed. with Anthony Grafton, The Transmission of Culture in Early Modern Europe, University of Pennsylvania Press, 1990, ISBN 978-0-8122-1667-7
- The Theater of Nature: Jean Bodin and Renaissance Science, Princeton, NJ: Princeton University Press, 1997, ISBN 978-0-691-05675-3
- Too Much to Know: Managing Scholarly Information before the Modern Age, Yale University Press, 2010 ISBN 9780300165395
- ed. with Anthony Grafton, Information: A Historical Companion, Princeton University Press, 2021.

=== Articles and chapters ===
- "Reading Strategies for Coping with Information Overload, ca. 1550-1700," Journal of the History of Ideas 64 (2003), pp. 11–28.
- "Note-Taking as an Art of Transmission," Critical Inquiry 31 (2004), pp. 85–107.
- "Natural Philosophy" in The Cambridge History of Science, vol. 3: Early Modern Science, ed. Katharine Park and Lorraine Daston (Cambridge: Cambridge University Press, 2006), pp. 365–405.
- "Organizations of Knowledge," in Cambridge Companion to Renaissance Philosophy, ed. James Hankins (Cambridge: Cambridge University Press, 2007), pp. 287–303.
- "Science and Religion," in Cambridge History of Christianity, vol. 6: Reform and Expansion, 1500–1660, ed. Ronnie Po-Chia Hsia (Cambridge: Cambridge University Press, 2007), pp. 427–45.
- (ed. with Jennifer Milligan), a special issue of Archival Science 7:4 (2007) entitled "Toward a cultural history of archives," with a co-authored introduction, pp. 289–96
- "Textbooks and Methods of Note-Taking in Early Modern Europe," in Scholarly Knowledge: Textbooks in Early Modern Europe, ed. Emidio Campi, Simone de Angelis, Anja-Silvia Goeing and Anthony Grafton (Geneva: Droz, 2008), pp. 39–73.
- "Corrections manuscrites et listes d'errata à la Renaissance," in Esculape et Dionysos. Mélanges en l'honneur de Jean Céard, ed. Jean Dupèbe, Franco Giacone, Emmanuel Naya and Anne-Pascale Pouey-Mounou (Geneva: Droz, 2008), pp. 269–86.
- "Disciplinary Distinctions before the 'Two Cultures,'" The European Legacy 13:5 (2008), pp. 577–88, in a special issue on "The Languages of the Sciences and the Languages of the Humanities," ed. Oren Harman.
- The rise of note-taking in Early Modern Europe. Intellectual History Review 20(3): 303-16.
