= Critical ignoring =

Choosing not to engage with misleading information

Critical ignoring is the practice of deliberately choosing not to engage with information that is irrelevant, misleading, or unreliable. It has been proposed as a way to manage information overload and reduce the influence of misinformation.
