= Cochrane Eyes and Vision =

Cochrane Eyes and Vision (CEV) is a collaboration of researchers and healthcare professionals who prepare systematic reviews to study interventions pertaining to the treatment of eye disease and visual impairment. Though many of the systematic reviews focus on common eye diseases, reviews have been prepared for varied eye topics, including screening prevention and rarer eye diseases.

== History ==
CEV was registered as a Cochrane group in 1997, and has an editorial base at the Centre for Public Health at Queen's University Belfast which is funded by the HSC Research and Development (R&D) Division of the Public Health Agency in Northern Ireland. The co-ordinating editors of CEV are Jennifer Evans, John Lawrenson and Gianni Virgili.

In 2019 Eye began to feature Cochrane Eye and Vision reviews intending to achieve wider readership.

In 2002, a CEV satellite branch was created in the United States, at the Johns Hopkins Bloomberg School of Public Health. The satellite branch was led by Professor Kay Dickersin until 2018 when Dr Tianjing Li took over. The United States satellite branch is now located at University of Colorado Anschutz Medical Campus, funded by the National Eye Institute. In 2011, a satellite branch was set up in Italy at the University of Florence to focus on diagnostic test accuracy (DTA) reviews and this is led by Professor Gianni Virgili.

Since 2016, CEV had a partnership with the American Academy of Ophthalmology to update their preferred practice pattern (PPP) guidelines. CEV has also had a partnership with the American Glaucoma Society to collaborate in research. Additionally, CEV works closely with the Wilmer Eye Institute of Johns Hopkins Hospital and the Byers Eye Institute of the Stanford University School of Medicine, as CEV Centers for Evidence-based Vision Care.

CEV has conducted over 190 systematic reviews in the field of ophthalmology. The most common topics reviewed include trials studying conditions such as glaucoma, macular degeneration, and cataract. Ophthalmic treatments investigated by CEV systematic reviews include patching for corneal abrasion, eyesight screening for visual impairment in the elderly, vitamin supplements for cataracts, NSAIDS for macular edema, antimetabolites for trabeculectomy, and antiviral agents for herpes simplex virus.

The organisation has previously had funding from The Guide Dogs for the Blind Association, Macular Society, National Institute for Health Research (NIHR) and Sightsavers.
