= Research synthesis =

Combination of results from multiple primary studies

Research synthesis or evidence synthesis is the process of combining the results of multiple primary research studies aimed at testing the same conceptual hypothesis. It may be applied to either quantitative or qualitative research. Its general goals are to make the findings from multiple different studies more generalizable and applicable.

It aims to generate new knowledge by combining and comparing the results of multiple studies on a given topic. One approach is to use a systematic review method.

== Techniques ==
Meta-analysis is the preferred technique of quantitative research synthesis in many fields, such as medical science. It is a statistical technique that combines measures of effect size from a number of studies to calculate an overall measure. This measure of effect has greater precision (less uncertainty) than the individual studies, but it may be biased by differences between the studies in study design, the type of evidence, or other key characteristics.

In qualitative research, methods of synthesis include narrative synthesis and meta-ethnography. Narrative synthesis allows researchers to address a wide range of questions in their review, while meta-ethnography aims to preserve the cultural context in which the original findings of the included studies were generated. The narrative synthesis approach has attracted criticism because of its potential for bias, with critics highlighting the subjective nature of the use of the method to draw conclusions. There is also evidence that reviews using the narrative synthesis approach often suffer from a lack of transparency.
