= ACM Conference on Recommender Systems =

Academic conference series

- Abbreviation: RecSys
- Discipline: Recommender Systems

Publication details
- Publisher: ACM
- History: 2007–present
- Frequency: Annual

ACM Conference on Recommender Systems (ACM RecSys) is an A-ranked peer-reviewed academic conference series about recommender systems. It is held annually in different locations, and organized by different organizers, but a Steering Committee supervises the organization. The conference proceedings are published by the Association for Computing Machinery. Acceptance rates for full papers are typically below 20%. This conference series focuses on issues such as algorithms, machine learning, human-computer interaction, and data science from a multi-disciplinary perspective. The conference community includes computer scientists, statisticians, social scientists, psychologists, and others.

The conference is sponsored every year by ten to 20 Big Tech companies such as Amazon, Netflix, Meta, Nvidia, Microsoft, Google, and Spotify.

While an academic conference, RecSys attracts many practitioners and industry researchers, with industry attendance making up the majority of attendees, this is also reflected in the authorship of research papers. Many works published at the conference have direct impact on recommendation and personalization practice in industry affecting millions of users.

Recommender systems are pervasive in online systems, the conference provides opportunities for researchers and practitioners to address specific problems in various workshops in conjunction with the conference, topics include responsible recommendation, causal reasoning, and others. The workshop themes follow recent developments in the broader machine learning and human-computer interaction topics.

The conference is the host of the ACM RecSys Challenge, a yearly competition in the spirit of the Netflix Prize focussing on a specific recommendation problem. The Challenge has been organized by companies such as Twitter, and Spotify. Participation in the challenge is open to everyone and participation in it has become a means of showcasing ones skills in recommendations, similar to Kaggle competitions.

== Notable Events ==
=== Netflix Prize, 2009 ===
The Netflix Prize was a recommendation challenge organized by Netflix between 2006 and 2009. Shortly prior to ACM RecSys 2009, the winners of the Netflix Prize were announced. At the 2009 conference, members of the winning team (Bellkor's Pragmatich Chaos) as well as representatives from Netflix convened in a panel on the lessons learnt from the Netflix Prize

=== ByteDance Paper, 2022 ===
In 2022, at one of the workshops at the conference, a paper from ByteDance, the company behind TikTok, described in detail how a recommendation algorithm for video worked. While the paper did not point out the algorithm as the one that generates TikTok's recommendations, the paper received significant attention in technology-focused media.

== List of conferences ==
Past and future RecSys conferences include:

Year	Location	Date	General Chairs	Link
2026	Minneapolis, MN	Sep. 28-Oct. 2	Joseph Konstan, George Karypis, Gediminas Adomavicious	Website
2025	Prague, Czech Republic	September 22-26	Mária Bieliková, Pavel Kordik, Markus Schedl	Website
2024	Bari, Italy	October 14-18	Pasquale Lops, Tommaso Di Noia	Website
2023	Singapore	September 18-22	Jie Zhang, Li Chen, Shlomo Berkovsky	Website
2022	Seattle, WA, USA and online	September 18-23	Jen Golbeck, Max Harper, Vanessa Murdock	Website
2021	Amsterdam, the Netherlands and online	September 27 - October 1	Martha Larson, Martijn Willemsen, Humberto Corona	Website
2020	Online	September 22-26	Leandro Balby Marinho, Rodrygo Santos	Website
2019	Copenhagen, Denmark	September 16-20	Toine Bogers, Alan Said	Website
2018	Vancouver, Canada	October 2-7	Sole Pera, Michael Ekstrand	Website
2017	Cernobbio, Italy	August 27-31	Paolo Cremonesi, Francesco Ricci	Website
2016	Boston, MA, USA	September 15-19	Werner Geyer, Shilad Sen	Website
2015	Vienna, Austria	September 16-20	Hannes Werthner, Markus Zanker	Website
2014	Foster City, CA, USA	October 6-10	Alfred Kobsa, Michelle Zhou	Website
2013	Hong Kong, China	October 12-16	Irwin King, Qiang Yang, Qing Li	Website
2012	Dublin, Ireland	September 9-13	Pádraig Cunningham, Neil Hurley	Website
2011	Chicago, IL, USA	October 23-27	Bamshad Mobasher, Robin Burke	Website
2010	Barcelona, Spain	September 26-30	Xavier Amatriain, Marc Torrens	Website
2009	New York, NY, USA	October 11-15	Lawrence Bergman, Alexander Tuzhilin	Website
2008	Lausanne, Switzerland	October 23-25	Pearl Pu	Website
2007	Minneapolis, MN, USA	September 19-20	Joe Konstan	Website

== Key Numbers and History ==
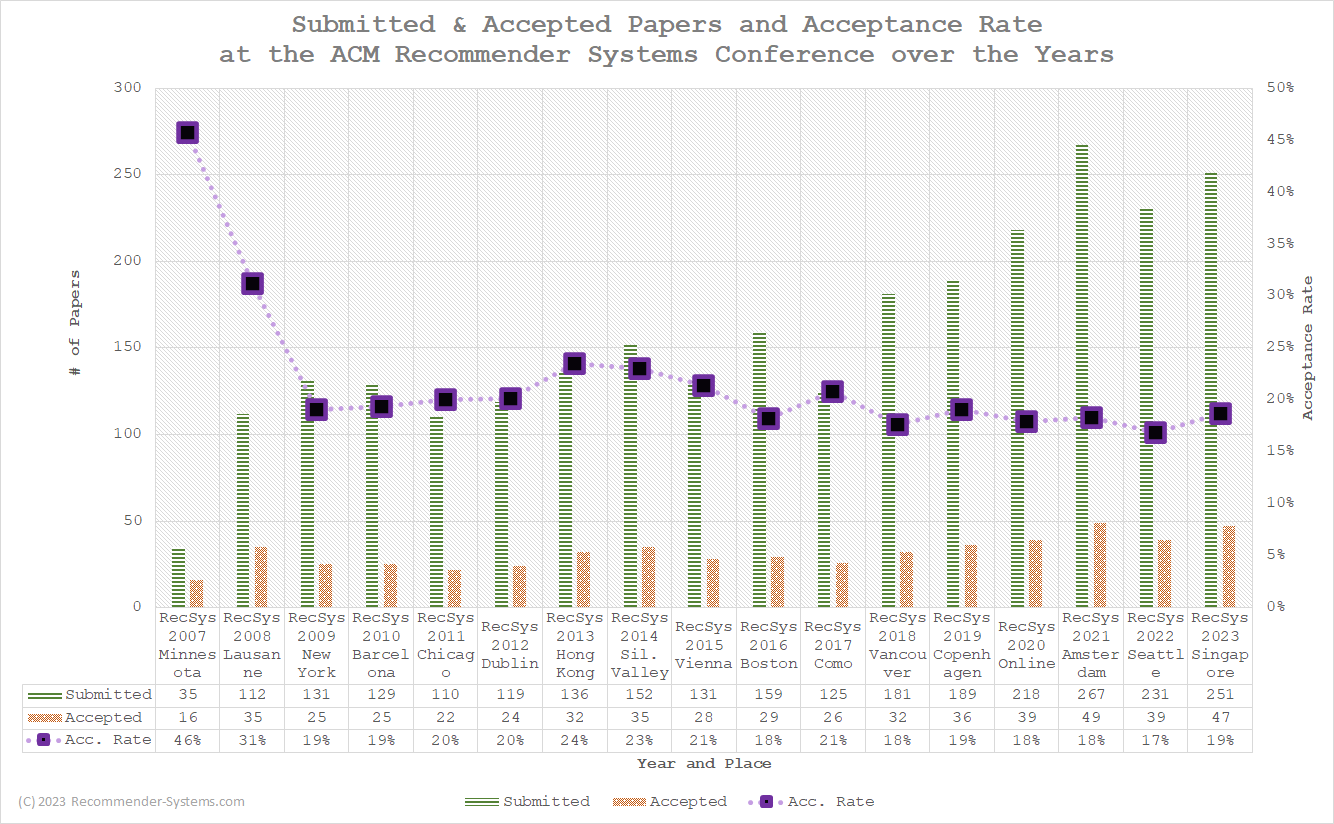
ACM RecSys Conference Stats (Acceptance Rates; Submissions; ...)

The ACM Recommender Systems Conference (RecSys) has experienced significant growth since its first event in 2007. The number of paper submissions has steadily increased over the years. From an initial 35 submissions in 2007, the conference has seen over 250 submissions annually in recent years. While the number of submissions has increased, the conference's acceptance rate has become more selective, declining from 46% in its inaugural year to a range of 17-24% in more recent editions.
