= Arvind Narayanan =

American computer scientist and professor

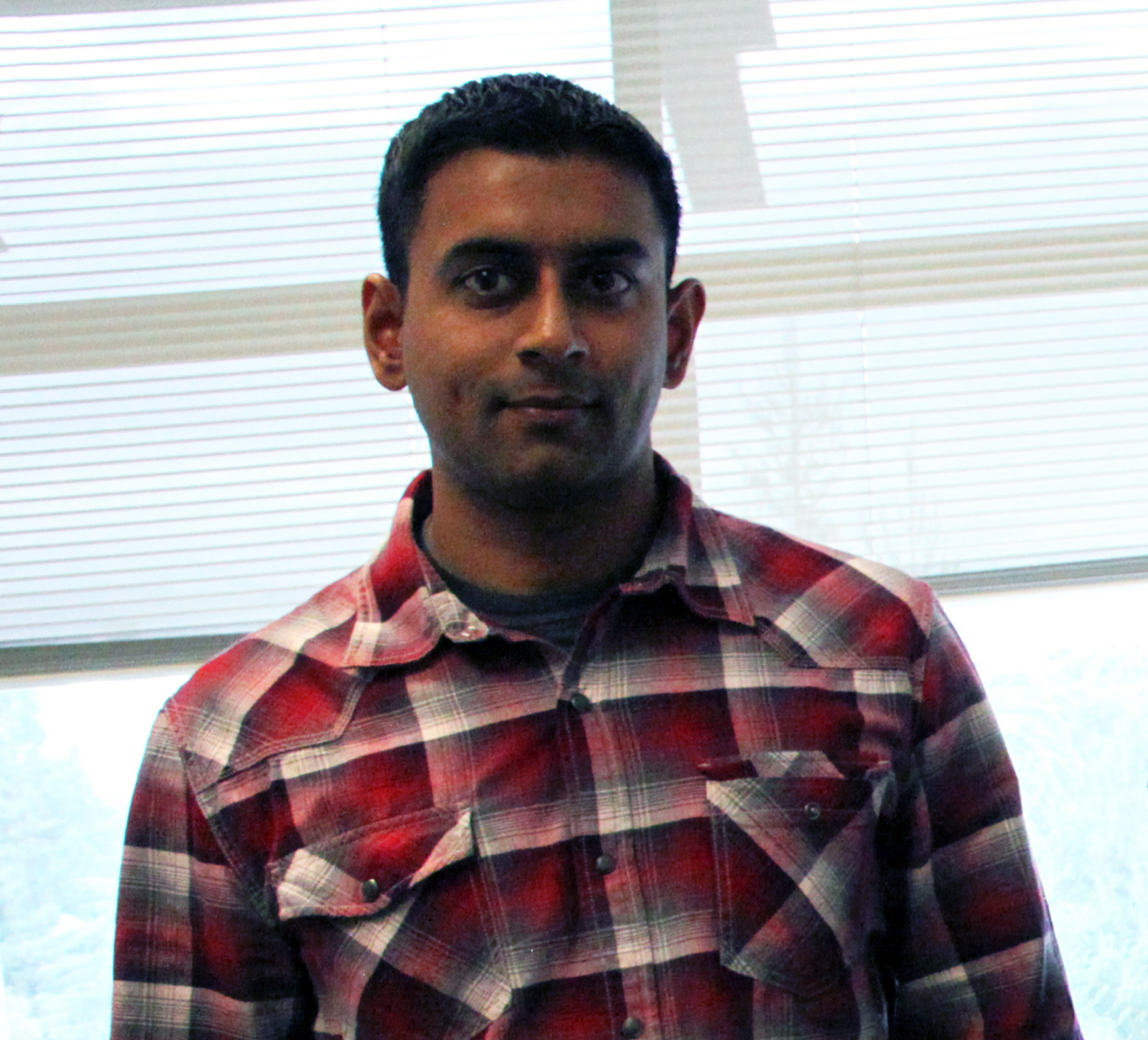
- Education: Indian Institute of Technology Madras; University of Texas at Austin
- Known for: De-anonymization, machine learning, societal impacts of technologies, criticism of claims surrounding generative AI
- Awards: Privacy Enhancing Technology Award
- Scientific career
- Workplaces: Stanford University; Princeton University
- Thesis: Data Privacy: the Non-interactive Setting (2009)
- Doctoral advisor: Vitaly Shmatikov
- Website: www.cs.princeton.edu/~arvindn

Arvind Narayanan is an American computer scientist and a professor at Princeton University. Narayanan is recognized for his research in machine learning, the societal impacts of technologies such as artificial intelligence and algorithms on social media, the de-anonymization of data, as well as his criticism of hype regarding generative AI. He is currently the director of Princeton's Center for Information Technology Policy.

== Biography ==
Narayanan received technical degrees from the Indian Institute of Technology Madras in 2004. His advisor was C. Pandu Rangan. Narayanan received his PhD in computer science from the University of Texas at Austin in 2009 under Vitaly Shmatikov. He worked briefly as a post-doctoral researcher at Stanford University, working closely with Dan Boneh. Narayanan moved to Princeton University as an assistant professor in September 2012. He was promoted to associate professor in 2014, and to professor in 2022.

== Career ==
In 2006 Netflix began the Netflix Prize competition for better recommendation algorithms. In order to facilitate the competition, Netflix released "anonymized" viewership information. However, Narayanan and advisor Vitaly Shmatikov showed possibilities for de-anonymizing this information by linking this anonymized data to publicly available IMDb user accounts. Narayanan later de-anonymized graphs from social networking and writings from blogs.

In mid-2010, Narayanan and Jonathan Mayer argued in favor of Do Not Track in HTTP headers. They built prototypes of Do Not Track for clients and servers. Working with Mozilla they wrote the influential Internet Engineering Task Force Internet Draft of Do Not Track.

Narayanan has written extensively about software cultures. He has argued for more substantial teaching of ethics in computer science education and cryptography. Narayanan is a co-author of the 2016 book Bitcoin and Cryptocurrency Technologies, published by Princeton University Press. He has also written about recommendation algorithms used by social media, machine learning (particularly in relation to privacy and fairness), and dark patterns.

In 2024, Narayanan and Sayash Kapoor wrote AI Snake Oil, a book debunking what Narayan regards as overinflated claims about generative AI. He writes a Substack of the same name critical of the hype regarding the current generative AI boom. Narayan views generative AI including large language models as a "normal technology" that is useful but will progress like previous technological revolutions, rejecting the views of both AI skeptics who are critical about the value of the technology and AI supporters who suggest that generative AI is a transformative technology unlike any before it.

== Awards ==
- Presidential Early Career Award for Scientists and Engineers
- Privacy Enhancing Technology Award 2008
