= Gravity R&D =

IT vendor company

Coordinates: 47.494013°N 19.122559°E

The Gravity R&D Company
- Company type: Private
- Industry: Software
- Founded: 2009
- Headquarters: Budapest, Hungary
- Area served: Worldwide
- Key people: Domonkos Tikk (CEO & co-founder) Bottyán Németh (product owner, co-founder) István Pilászy (head of development, co-founder)
- Products: Yusp, Yuspify for e-commerce
- Services: IT services, personalization, SaaS
- Owner: Hungarian institutional strategic investors, Wojciech Uzdelewicz, founders
- Number of employees: 25
- Website: yusp.com

Gravity R&D (full name: Gravity Research & Development Zrt.) is an IT vendor specialized in recommender systems. Gravity was founded by members of the Netflix Prize team "Gravity". Gravity is headquartered in Hungary (Budapest & Győr) with a subsidiary in Japan.

== History ==
=== Netflix Prize ===
The Netflix Prize was an open competition for the best collaborative filtering algorithm to predict user ratings for films, based on previous ratings. The prize would be awarded to the team achieving over 10% improvement over Netflix's own Cinematch algorithm.

The team "Gravity" was the front runner during January—May 2007.

The leading position was achieved again in October 2007 in collaboration with the team "Dinosaur Planet" under the name "When Gravity and Dinosaurs Unite".

In January 2009, the two teams founded "Grand Prize Team" to initiate even wider collaboration that resulted in being one of the leading teams throughout 2009.

On July 25th 2009, the team "The Ensemble", a merger of the teams "Grand Prize Team" and "Opera Solutions and Vandelay United", achieved a 10.10% improvement over Cinematch on the Quiz set.

On September 18, 2009, Netflix announced team "BellKor's Pragmatic Chaos" as the prize winner, and the prize was awarded to the team in a ceremony on September 21, 2009. "The Ensemble" team had in fact succeeded to match the winning "BellKor" team's result, but since "BellKor" submitted their results 20 minutes earlier, the rules award the prize to them.

Details on the algorithms developed by the Gravity team can be found in their scientific publications. Some algorithms are patented in the US.

The data mining team of the company is actively doing research in the field of recommender systems and publish their recent results regularly.

=== Yusp ===
On the model of P&G, Gravity separated company name and product name in 2017. The company name will remain Gravity while the brand name is changed to Yusp. Yusp is the name of the new generation personalization engine. Under Yusp, Gravity currently develops different product lines for enterprise, online-only, and bricks and mortar retail, telecommunications and retail banking customers and potential customers.
