= M. Scott Taylor =

Canadian economist (born 1960)

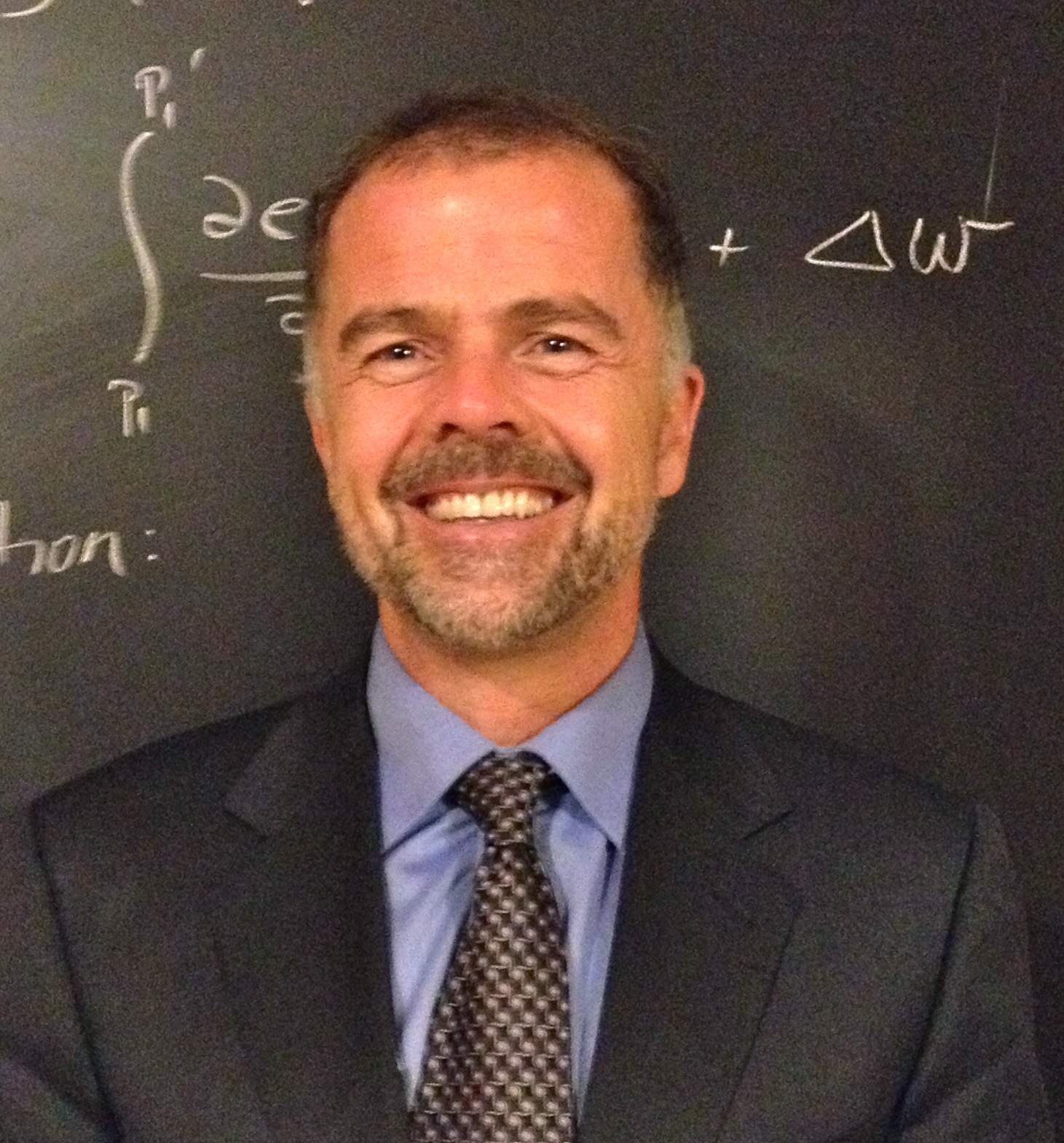
- M. Scott Taylor in 2011
- Born: 30 July 1960 (age 66)

Academic background
- Education: Queen's University; University of Calgary
- Doctoral advisor: Richard G. Harris
- Website: Information at IDEAS / RePEc

Michael Scott Taylor (born 30 July 1960) is a Canadian economist, who studies the interaction between international trade and environmental outcomes. He is currently the Canada Research Chair in International, Energy and Environmental Economics at the University of Calgary, a research associate at the National Bureau of Economic Research, and a Fellow of the Beijer Institute of Ecological Economics. He is also the recipient of an honorary doctorate from the University of Basel (2010). In 2014, Scott Taylor was named fellow to the Royal Society of Canada (RSC).

== Education ==
Taylor received his B.A. and M.A. in Economics from the University of Calgary and his Ph.D. from Queen's University in 1991 under the supervision of Richard G. Harris. Following his Ph.D., Taylor held a Killam Postdoctoral Fellowship and spent time at the Sauder School of Business at the University of British Columbia. Taylor was also awarded an Honorary Doctorate by the University of Basel, Switzerland for his pioneering work on trade, the environment and renewable resources. In 2014, Scott Taylor was named fellow to the Royal Society of Canada (RSC).

== Career ==
After completing his postdoctoral fellowship, Taylor held academic positions at the University of British Columbia (1992–1998) and the University of Wisconsin-Madison (1998–2004), before returning to the University of Calgary. During his career, Taylor has also been a visiting scholar at Princeton University (1991, 2003) and a scholar of the Economic Growth Program at the Canadian Institute for Advanced Research (1995–1998).

Taylor's research focuses on the interaction of international markets, economic growth and environmental outcomes. He studies how international trade and economic growth affects pollution across countries. Other important work connects the health of biological resources such as the bison respond to the pressures brought about by globalization. He has investigated the role natural resource collapses have played in the rise and fall of prehistoric societies, such as Easter Island, how growth and trade jointly determine environmental outcomes, and how access to international markets affects research and development and long run growth. His book (co-authored with Brian Copeland) Trade and the Environment: Theory and Evidence, was published by Princeton University Press in 2003 as part of the Princeton Series in International Economics and won the 2004 Douglas Purvis Memorial Prize for its contribution to Canadian Economic Policy.

Taylor is an associate editor of the Journal of International Economics, on the Board of Directors of the Beijer Institute of Ecological Economics.
