= Information filter =

Information filter may refer to

- Information filtering system
- Kalman filter § Information filter
