= Product finder =

Product finders are information systems that help consumers to identify products within a large palette of similar alternative products. Product finders differ in complexity, the more complex among them being a special case of decision support systems. Conventional decision support systems, however, aim at specialized user groups, e.g. marketing managers, whereas product finders focus on consumers.

== Area of application ==
Usually, product finders are part of an e-shop or an online presentation of a product-line. Being part of an e-shop, a product finder ideally leads to an online buy, while conventional distribution channels are involved in product finders that are part of an online presentation (e.g. shops, order by phone).

Product finders are best suited for product groups whose individual products are comparable by specific criteria. This is true, in most cases, with technical products such as notebooks: their features (e.g. clock rate, size of harddisk, price, screen size) may influence the consumer's decision.

Beside technical products such as notebooks, cars, dish washers, cell phones or GPS devices, non-technical products such as wine, socks, toothbrushes or nails may be supported by product finders as well, as comparison by features takes place.

On the other hand, the application of product finders is limited when it comes to individualized products such as books, jewelry or compact discs as consumers do not select such products along specific, comparable features.

Furthermore, product finders are used not only for products sensu stricto, but for services as well, e.g. account types of a bank, health insurance, or communication providers. In these cases, the term service finder is used sometimes.

Product finders are used both by manufacturers, dealers (comprising several manufacturers), and web portals (comprising several dealers).

There is a move to integrate Product finders with social networking and group buying allowing users to add and rate products, locations and purchase recommended products with others.

== Technical implementation ==
Technical implementations differ in their benefit for the consumers. The following list displays the main approaches, from simple ones to more complex ones, each with a typical example:

1. Dialogue systems or Interactive product finders (Product Wizards) – Interactive Product finders are dialogue-based recommendation solutions that provide shoppers with personalized, need-oriented support as they want to choose the right product. Based on an interactive dialog, in which the user answers a couple of questions, the solution analyzes the user’s answers, translates them into product features and matches them against available products in the background. After each process, the user is presented with a list of suitable products. Product wizards take into account the shoppers’ expectations, individual preferences and situations to assist them in finding products that fit their needs, provide detailed product information to increase shopper’s confidence and encourage an online purchase.
2. Comparison table – A comparison table is a basic version of a product finder that allows consumers to easily compare products, features and prices. Using structured rows and columns, a comparison table puts products and services side-by-side with all the relevant features and prices listed below each product. The simplistic and visually appealing method allows consumers to make quick distinctions between products and chose the best one for their needs.
3. Menu trees – A menu tree is a table that displays a hierarchy of items which can be expanded or collapsed at the viewer's convenience. Using a menu tree, businesses can categorize their products to help visitors navigate and narrow down the product they are looking for. It does require some knowledge and understanding of the provides categories and labels. For example, an online clothing retail site might have a drop down for "Tops" which would expand into options including, "T-Shirts", "Sweaters", or "Jackets".
4. String search – A string search algorithm locates where several smaller strings are within a larger text. For example, if a user typed "smart phone" into a Google search, Google would be searching to find where that keyword is located within different scripts and codes to refer the user to the most relevant information possible.
5. Filtering systems – An information filtering system is a system that removes redundant information from an information stream before presenting it to a human user. The purpose of these systems is to manage information overload so that users can find more immediately helpful information. An example of this would be news feeds on various platforms. A notebook filter, for instance, allows users to select features to narrow down the list of displayed products. However, filters such as these require the user to have prior knowledge of the domain and the features that are available to select. Another drawback is the potential that a user could encounter zero results through the filtering system.
6. Scoring systems – Scoring systems are often found on recommender systems and allow users to rate products for other users to see. Netflix, an online DVD rental and online streaming service, is a perfect example of a scoring system being implemented. Netflix allows users to rate TV shows and movies on a 1 to 5 star system, 1 star being poor and 5 stars being excellent. The Mac Observer, a popular recommender and news site that reviews Apple products, has recently announced they will be changing their scoring system. Instead of using the traditional 5 star system, TMO will be offering options such as, "Outstanding Product. Get It Now!" or "Not Recommended. Steer Clear!" as a scoring system.
7. Tagging clouds – A tag cloud is a visual representation of text data, used to simplified and decode keywords and tags on websites. The tags are usually single words and the importance of each tag is represented by the color and size of the word. This is a useful format to help users quickly perceive the most relevant terms. In product finders, tag clouds will have their tags hyperlinked so that a user can easily navigate the website. To find the product the user is looking for, they would find the tag within the cloud, click on the tag and be directed to a landing page where their desired product is featured.
8. Neural Networks – A neural network is a family of learning models inspired by biological neural networks (the nervous systems of animals, in particular the brain) and are used to estimate user preferences. Neural networks have classification abilities, including pattern recognition. Netflix, for example, uses a neural network to see what genre of movies you prefer to watch. Neural networks also do data processing, including data filtering, similar to the purpose of a filtering system.
9. Relational Database – A relational database is a digital database which organizes data into tables (or "relations") of rows and columns, with a unique key for each row. Unlike hierarchical tables such as menu trees, relational database tables can have rows that are linked to rows in other tables by a keyword that they may share. The relationships between these tables can take several forms: one-to-one, one-to-many or many-to-many. Databases like these make it simple for product finders to discover the relationships between keywords that consumer uses. This information helps these systems predict what consumers will be interesting in purchasing so the software can guide customers to their ideal product and encourage a sale.

== E-commerce (using machine learning) ==
Product finders and recommender systems are used in e-commerce to categorize items and generate recommendations. Online commerce involves large volumes of data and uses systems for data management and analysis. Machine learning and automated tools are used to process large datasets.

=== Large scale item categorization ===
Online commerce has expanded over the past decade. Marketplaces such as eBay, Amazon, and Alibaba include millions of items. Item categorization uses tags and labels for product organization. Traditionally, the bag-of-words model has been used in this process, with or without a hierarchy or human-defined structures.

A new method, using hierarchical approach which decomposes the classification problem into a coarse level task and a fine level task, with the hierarchy made using latent class model discovery. A simple classifier is applied to perform the coarse level classification (because the data is so large we cannot use more sophisticated approach due to time issue) while a more sophisticated model is used to separate classes at the fine level.

Highlights/Methods used:

- Latent group discovery: used to find groups of classes and the words or features associated to each class. Then we form a confusion matrix between groups to approximate the similarity of classes, the similar classes are kept in a group and so at every stage we get groups with no similarity and hence we get a hierarchy tree.
- At Coarse level we classify the testing instance, for one of the groups at the first level of hierarchy, As the data set is large we cannot use sophisticated algorithm, and thus at this stage either KNN or Naive Bayes is used.
- At fine level we classify the items within a group into some subset group, as there can be similarity in the group we use a sophisticated mechanism, generally SVM at every node.
- KNN (k nearest neighbours) algorithm finds the k neighbours which are really similar to the testing instance, it uses Euclidean or cosine similarity function to find the distance between each class and then gives the top k class.
- electronics → mobile → samsung → case covers. In this example the coarse grained classifier would tell us that the testing instance belongs to electronic group, then we use fine grained at every stage and we got this tree.

The problem faced by these online e-commerce companies are:

1. Large Scale,
2. Item data extremely sparse
3. Skewed distribution over categories
4. Heterogeneous characteristics over categories

=== Recommender system ===
Recommendation systems are used to recommend consumer items/product based on their purchasing or search history.

== See also ==
- Recommendation system
