= Jussi Karlgren =

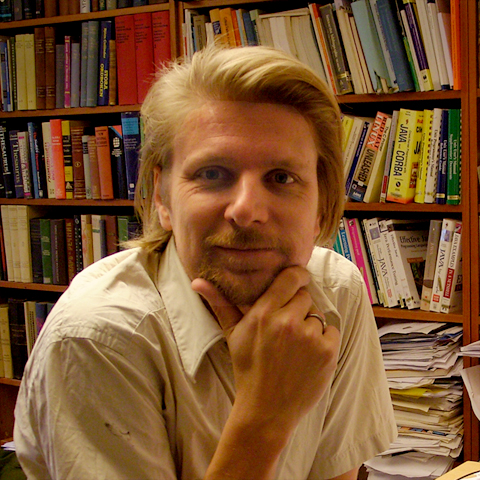

Jussi Karlgren is a Swedish computational linguist. He has been a research scientist at Spotify, and co-founded text analytics company Gavagai AB. He holds a PhD in computational linguistics from Stockholm University, and the title of docent (adjoint professor) of language technology at Helsinki University.

Jussi Karlgren is known for having pioneered the application of computational linguistics to stylometry, for having first formulated the notion of a recommender system, and for his continued work in bringing non-topical features of text to the attention of the information access research field.

Karlgren's research is focused on questions relating to information access, genre and stylistics, distributional pragmatics, and evaluation of information access applications and distributional models.

Karlgren is of half Finnish descent and is fluent in Finnish.
