= Accuracy barrier =

Limit to value of recommender systems

The accuracy barrier is a concept in recommender systems referring to limits in the practical usefulness of accuracy-based evaluation metrics. It describes the observation that improvements in offline accuracy measures, such as prediction error or ranking accuracy, do not necessarily lead to improved user experience or real-world system performance. The concept is closely related to earlier discussions of a magic barrier, which attribute such limits to natural variability in user behavior and feedback.

== Background ==
The term magic barrier was coined by Herlocker et al. to describe a hypothesized limit on recommendation accuracy caused by natural variability in user ratings, based on observations that different algorithms often converge to similar accuracy levels when evaluated offline. In later literature, this limit has been discussed in terms of its implications for accuracy-based evaluation, often referred to as the accuracy barrier. Said et al. provided a mathematical characterization of this limit in terms of rating noise and empirical risk minimization, framing it as a lower bound on achievable prediction accuracy for recommender systems.

User studies have shown that individuals often provide inconsistent ratings when asked to evaluate the same items at different points in time. This variability introduces noise into recommender system datasets and imposes a lower bound on achievable prediction accuracy. As a result, offline evaluation metrics may converge even when recommendation algorithms differ in design or complexity.

== Implications ==
The accuracy barrier has influenced evaluation practices in recommender systems by motivating research beyond accuracy-centric optimization. It has contributed to increased attention to user-centered and behavioral evaluation criteria, as well as caution against over-interpreting small improvements in offline accuracy benchmarks.

== See also ==
- Recommender systems
- Personalization
- User modeling
