= Irwin King =

Hong Kong computer scientist

- Born: Hong Kong
- Citizenship: Chinese (Hong Kong)
- Scientific career
- Fields: Computer science
- Workplaces: Chinese University of Hong Kong

Irwin King is a Hong Kong computer scientist known for his contributions to machine learning, social computing, and recommender systems.

== Career ==
King is a professor in the Department of Computer Science and Engineering at the Chinese University of Hong Kong. His research focuses on machine learning and social computing, including work on social recommendation, trust-aware recommender systems, and graph-based learning.

King has served as editor-in-chief of the journal ACM Transactions on Intelligent Systems and Technology (TIST).

== Awards ==
- ACM Fellow (2024)
- IEEE Fellow (2019)
- INNS Fellow (2021)
- AAIA Fellow (2022)
- HKIE Fellow
- ACM WSDM Test of Time Award (2022)
- ACM SIGIR Test of Time Award (2020)
- ACM CIKM Test of Time Award (2019)
- 2021 INNS Dennis Gabor Award for work in Neural Engineering for Social Computing
- 2020 APNNS Outstanding Achievement Award
