= Princeton Series in International Economics =

Economics book

The Princeton Series in International Economics is a book series published by Princeton University Press. The series editor is Gene Grossman. The series was created in 2003.

The series includes commissioned works by experts in macroeconomics, international finance and international trade. The books are targeted toward policy professionals in government, business, and international organizations; to scholars working in political science and economics; and to students studying international economics.

Titles in the series include:

- Trade and the Environment: Theory and Evidence by Brian R. Copeland and M. Scott Taylor (2003)
- Exchange-Rate Dynamics by Martin D. D. Evans (2011)
