= Information explosion =

Rapid increase in the amount of published information or data

Information explosion is the rapid increase in the amount of published information or data and the effects of this abundance. As the amount of available data grows, the problem of managing the information becomes more difficult, which can lead to information overload. The Online Oxford English Dictionary indicates use of the phrase in a March 1964 New Statesman article. The New York Times first used the phrase in its editorial content in an article by Walter Sullivan on June 7, 1964, in which he described the phrase as "much discussed". The earliest known use of the phrase was in a speech about television by NBC president Pat Weaver at the Institute of Practitioners of Advertising in London on September 27, 1955. The speech was rebroadcast on radio station WSUI in Iowa City and excerpted in the Daily Iowan newspaper two months later.

Many sectors are seeing this rapid increase in the amount of information available such as healthcare, supermarkets, and governments. Another sector that is being affected by this phenomenon is journalism. Such a profession, which in the past was responsible for the dissemination of information, may be suppressed by the overabundance of information today.

Techniques to gather knowledge from an overabundance of electronic information (e.g., data fusion may help in data mining) have existed since the 1970s. Another common technique to deal with such amount of information is qualitative research. Such approaches aim to organize the information, synthesizing, categorizing and systematizing in order to be more usable and easier to search.

== Growth patterns ==
- The world's technological capacity to store information grew from, optimally compressed, 2.6 exabytes in 1986 to 15.7 in 1993, over 54.5 in 2000, and to 295 exabytes in 2007.
- The world's technological capacity to receive information through one-way broadcast networks was 432 exabytes of (optimally compressed) information in 1986, 715 (optimally compressed) exabytes in 1993, 1,200 (optimally compressed) exabytes in 2000, and 1,900 in 2007.
- The world's effective capacity to exchange information through two-way telecommunications networks was 0.281 exabytes of (optimally compressed) information in 1986, 0.471 in 1993, 2.2 in 2000, and 65 (optimally compressed) exabytes in 2007.

A new metric that is being used in an attempt to characterize the growth in person-specific information, is the disk storage per person (DSP), which is measured in megabytes/person (where megabytes is 10^{6} bytes and is abbreviated MB). Global DSP (GDSP) is the total rigid disk drive space (in MB) of new units sold in a year divided by the world population in that year. The GDSP metric is a crude measure of how much disk storage could possibly be used to collect person-specific data on the world population. In 1983, one million fixed drives with an estimated total of 90 terabytes were sold worldwide; 30MB drives had the largest market segment. In 1996, 105 million drives, totaling 160,623 terabytes were sold with 1 and 2 gigabyte drives leading the industry. By the year 2000, with 20GB drive leading the industry, rigid drives sold for the year are projected to total 2,829,288 terabytes Rigid disk drive sales to top $34 billion in 1997.

According to Latanya Sweeney, there are three trends in data gathering today:

Type 1. Expansion of the number of fields being collected, known as the “collect more” trend.

Type 2. Replace an existing aggregate data collection with a person-specific one, known as the “collect specifically” trend.

Type 3. Gather information by starting a new person-specific data collection, known as the “collect it if you can” trend.

== Related terms ==
Since "information" in electronic media is often used synonymously with "data", the term information explosion is closely related to the concept of data flood (also dubbed data deluge). Sometimes the term information flood is used as well. All of those basically boil down to the ever-increasing amount of electronic data exchanged per time unit. A term that covers the potential negative effects of information explosion is information inflation. The awareness about non-manageable amounts of data grew along with the advent of ever more powerful data processing since the mid-1960s.

== Challenges ==
Even though the abundance of information can be beneficial in several levels, some problems may be of concern such as privacy, legal and ethical guidelines, filtering and data accuracy. Filtering refers to finding useful information in the middle of so much data, which relates to the job of data scientists. A typical example of a necessity of data filtering (data mining) is in healthcare since in the next years is due to have EHRs (Electronic Health Records) of patients available. With so much information available, the doctors will need to be able to identify patterns and select important data for the diagnosis of the patient. On the other hand, according to some experts, having so much public data available makes it difficult to provide data that is actually anonymous. Another point to take into account is the legal and ethical guidelines, which relates to who will be the owner of the data and how frequently he/she is obliged to the release this and for how long. With so many sources of data, another problem will be accuracy of such. An untrusted source may be challenged by others, by ordering a new set of data, causing a repetition in the information. According to Edward Huth, another concern is the accessibility and cost of such information. The accessibility rate could be improved by either reducing the costs or increasing the utility of the information. The reduction of costs according to the author, could be done by associations, which should assess which information was relevant and gather it in a more organized fashion.

== Web servers ==
As of August 2005, there were over 70 million web servers. As of September 2007 there were over 135 million web servers.

== Blogs ==
According to Technorati, the number of blogs was doubling about every 6 months with a total of 35.3 million blogs as of April 2006.

== See also ==
- Big data – Extremely large or complex datasets
- Curse of dimensionality – Difficulties arising when analyzing data with many aspects ("dimensions")
- Combinatorial explosion – Rapid growth of the complexity of a problem due to its combinatorial properties
- Data mining – Process of analyzing large data sets
- Information society – Society driven by the processing and communication of information
- Information Age – Industrial shift to information technology
- Information filtering system
- Metcalfe's law – Value of a communication network in terms of its connections
- Neuroenhancement – Extension of cognition in the healthy
- Second half of the chessboard – Mathematical problem
