= Princeton University Press =

Independent publisher associated with Princeton University

- Founded: 1905; 121 years ago
- Founder: Whitney Darrow
- Country of origin: United States
- Headquarters location: Princeton, New Jersey
- Distribution: Ingram Publisher Services (Americas, Asia, Australia); John Wiley & Sons (EMEA, India); United Publishers Services (Japan)
- Publication types: Books
- Official website: press.princeton.edu

Princeton University Press is an independent nonprofit publisher closely affiliated with Princeton University. Founded in 1905, its mission is to disseminate scholarly ideas within academia and among the broader public. With over 10,000 titles in print, Princeton University Press publishes more than 300 new non-fiction books each year. It is headquartered in Princeton, NJ, with additional offices in Oxford, England and Beijing, China.

Christie Henry became the press' ninth director in 2017. Since then, the press has diversified its offerings to include audiobooks, a speakers' bureau, and representation of other publishers' titles in China. In 2025, Princeton University Press acquired Island Press, a nonprofit publisher that focuses on environmental issues and the built environment.

== History ==
=== 20th century ===
Princeton University Press was founded in 1905 by Whitney Darrow, a recent Princeton graduate. Darrow received initial funding for the press from Charles Scribner II, a Princeton trustee and partner in the New York publishing house Charles Scribner's Sons. Beginning as a small, for-profit printer, Princeton University Press was reincorporated as a nonprofit in 1910 and gradually developed into a full-fledged book publisher. In 1912, the press published its first book, a new edition of Lectures on Moral Philosophy by John Witherspoon.

Early notable publications included The Meaning of Relativity (1922) by Albert Einstein — his first book published in the United States — and Theory of Games and Economic Behavior (1944) by John von Neumann and Oskar Morgenstern, which helped establish the field of game theory.

In 1950, the press presented the first volume of The Papers of Thomas Jefferson at a Library of Congress ceremony attended by President Harry S. Truman. In 1969, Paul Mellon donated the Bollingen Series to the press, adding a backlist that included The I Ching, or Book of Changes and The Collected Works of C. G. Jung.

In 1999, the press opened a European office in Woodstock, England, near Oxford.

=== 21st century ===
In 2012, Princeton University Press (PUP) launched the Princeton Legacy Library, using print-on-demand technology to return more than 2,700 out-of-print titles to availability. In 2014, it created the Digital Einstein Papers, a public platform providing free access to The Collected Papers of Albert Einstein--providing the first comprehensive collection and English translation of Einstein's written legacy.

Christie Henry became the press's director in 2017, the first woman to hold the position. That same year, the press opened a Beijing office, becoming the first university press to do so.

In 2018, the press launched Princeton Audio, an in-house audio imprint that has since released more than 200 audiobooks, including Karl Marx's Capital: Critique of Political Economy, Volume 1. In 2022, PUP expanded the program's reach with the debut of an audiobook app and direct-to-consumer website sales, supported through a partnership with Glassboxx.

In 2018 the press also launched a strategic initiative to diversify publishing. As part of a commitment to highlight voices and topics that have been historically underrecognized in the academy, the press launched a global equity grant program in 2020 to support authors under contract with resources to help with manuscript development; the majority of grants awarded in this program have been to assist authors with child and family care. In 2021 the press initiated Book Proposal Development Grants. Grantees receive coaching from partner book coaches and Princeton University Press editors, and subsequent consideration for publication. In 2020, the press launched a Publishing Fellowship, aimed at increasing diversity across the publishing industry. The program offers full-time, salaried positions that provide immersive training in nonfiction publishing, as well as mentoring and career coaching.

Princeton University Press joined The Association of American Publishers trade organization in the Hachette v. Internet Archive lawsuit in 2020 over concerns that the archive facilitated copyright infringement of their books. The suit resulted in the removal of access to over 500,000 books from global readers.

In 2021, the press established PUP Speaks, an in-house speakers' bureau representing select authors for paid speaking events. In 2021 the press also moved its UK office to Oxford, acquiring 99 Banbury Road and increasing space for the further growth of PUP Europe.

From its Beijing office, the press developed a business representing other publishers' titles in China. The University of Chicago Press became a client in 2022, followed by W. W. Norton & Company in 2025 and Johns Hopkins University Press in 2026.

In 2023, Princeton University Press entered a publishing partnership with Editorial Planeta US to support simultaneous publication of general interest titles in English and in Spanish. The first title in the partnership was Puerto Rico: A National History by Jorell Meléndez-Badillo. Meléndez-Badillo collaborated with Bad Bunny, writing short historical narratives to accompany the performer's album, Debí Tirar Más Fotos.

In 2025, Princeton University Press was criticized when several members of its staff appeared in Chinese state media on an officially-sanctioned tour of sites in Xinjiang.

In 2025, the press acquired Island Press, a Washington, D.C.-based nonprofit publisher that focuses on environmental topics including conservation, food systems, and urban planning. Island Press became a Princeton University Press imprint on January 1, 2026.

== Major awards ==
Seven books from Princeton University Press have won Pulitzer Prizes:

- Russia Leaves the War by George F. Kennan (1957)
- Banks and Politics in America from the Revolution to the Civil War by Bray Hammond (1958)
- Between War and Peace by Herbert Feis (1961)
- Washington: Village and Capital by Constance McLaughlin Green (1963)
- The Greenback Era by Irwin Unger (1965)
- Machiavelli in Hell by Sebastian de Grazia (1989)
- To the Success of Our Hopeless Cause by Benjamin Nathans (2024)

Three books published by Princeton University Press have won the National Book Award:

- Russia Leaves the War by George F. Kennan (1957, National Book Award for Nonfiction)
- Monsieur Teste by Paul Valéry, trans. Jackson Mathews (1974, Award for Translated Literature)
- The Agony of Christianity and Essays on Faith by Miguel de Unamuno, trans. Anthony Kerrigan (1975, Award for Translated Literature)

Two Princeton University Press books were finalists for the National Book Award:

- The Poison King by Adrienne Mayor (2009)
- Running Out by Lucas Bessire (2021)

== Other awards ==
Princeton University Press (PUP) books have won five Bancroft Prizes, which are awarded by the trustees of Columbia University for books about diplomacy or the history of the Americas, as well as hundreds of awards from academic organizations. Books from Princeton University Press have also been awarded the Nautilus Book Award, a prize for books about social and environmental justice.

More than 50 Princeton University Press authors have been awarded Nobel prizes in economics, physics, chemistry, medicine, and literature. Most recently, Daron Acemoglu shared the 2024 Nobel prize in economics for research on economic growth and institutions. In 2023, Claudia Goldin was awarded the Nobel prize in economics for her work on women's labor market outcomes. Goldin authored Career & Family: Women's Century-Long Journey toward Equity, which was published by Princeton University Press in 2021.

Princeton University Press authors have received the Fields Medal, the Holberg Prize, and the Cundill Prize. Princeton University Press books have been named among the year's best reads by publications around the world.

Princeton University Press has achieved significant recognition in the Association of American Publishers (AAP) PROSE Awards, winning the prestigious R.R. Hawkins Award in 2023 for Spiderweb Capitalism by Kimberly Kay Hoang and in 2024 for The Voices of Nature by Nicolas Mathevon.

Princeton University Press won the prestigious International Excellence Academic and Professional Publisher Award at the 2020 London Book Fair. This award recognized the press for its innovation, global impact, and excellence in scholarly publishing.

PUP was shortlisted for the 2025 British Book Awards Academic, Educational, and Professional Publisher award, marking their third nomination in this category (previously 2021, 2023).

== Papers projects ==
Multi-volume historical documents projects undertaken by the press include:

- The Collected Papers of Albert Einstein
- The Writings of Henry D. Thoreau
- The Papers of Woodrow Wilson (sixty-nine volumes)
- The Papers of Thomas Jefferson
- Kierkegaard's Writings

The Papers of Woodrow Wilson has been called "one of the great editorial achievements in all history."

== Bollingen Series ==
Since 1969, Princeton University Press has published the Bollingen Series, which features some 275 iconic books in psychology, mythology, archaeology, art history, religion, literature, and related fields, including the collected works of C. G. Jung, Samuel Taylor Coleridge, and Paul Valéry, as well as the A. W. Mellon Lectures in the Fine Arts. Originally published by Pantheon Books, the Bollingen series was given to Princeton University in 1969. The series had its beginnings in the Bollingen Foundation, a 1943 project of Mary and Paul Mellon's Old Dominion Foundation. A reissuing of the entire Bollingen series commenced in 2024, and in 2026 the new translation of the Critical Edition of the Works of C.E. Jung will be published.

== Other series ==
=== Sciences ===
- Annals of Mathematics Studies (Alice Chang, Phillip A. Griffiths, Assaf Naor, editors; Lillian Pierce, associate editor)
- Princeton Series in Applied Mathematics (Ingrid Daubechies, Weinan E, Jan Karel Lenstra, Endre Süli, editors)
- Princeton Series in Astrophysics (David N. Spergel, editor)
- Princeton Series in Complexity (Simon A. Levin and Steven H. Strogatz, editors)
- Princeton Series in Evolutionary Biology (H. Allen Orr, editor)
- Princeton Series in International Economics (Gene M. Grossman, editor)
- Princeton Science Library

=== Humanities ===
- Princeton Modern Greek Studies
- Ancient Wisdom for Modern Readers
- Oddly Modern Fairy Tales

=== Nature ===
- Princeton Field Guides
- Wild Guides (Andy Swash and Robert Still, editors)
- Pedia series

=== Princeton Legacy Library ===
The Princeton Legacy Library uses print-on-demand technology to make available previously out-of-print books from Princeton University Press backlist.

== Notable books ==
- AI Snake Oil by Arvind Narayanan and Sayash Kapoor (2024)
- Capital, Volume 1 by Karl Marx (translation, 2024)
- To the Success of our Hopeless Cause by Benjamin Nathans (2024)
- The Wife of Bath by Marion Turner (2023)
- The New Makers of Modern Strategy, Hal Brands, ed. (2023)
- Viral Justice by Ruha Benjamin (2022)
- In Praise of Good Bookstores by Jeff Deutsch (2022)
- 1177 B.C.: The Year Civilization Collapsed by Eric H. Cline (2021)
- Career and Family by Claudia Goldin (2021)
- Deaths of Despair and the Future of Capitalism by Anne Case and Angus Deaton (2020)
- The Obama Portraits by Taína Caragol, Dorothy Moss, Richard J. Powell, and Kim Sajet, (2020)
- Narrative Economics by Robert J. Shiller (2019)
- Welcome to the Universe by Neil deGrasse Tyson, Michael A. Strauss, and J. Richard Gott (2015)
- The Original Folk and Fairy Tales of the Brothers Grimm by Jacob Grimm and Wilhelm Grimm (translation, 2014)
- The Whites of Their Eyes: The Tea Party's Revolution and the Battle over American History by Jill Lepore (2010)
- The Great Contraction 1929–1933 by Milton Friedman and Anna Jacobson Schwartz (1963) with a new Introduction by Peter L. Bernstein (2008)
- On Bullshit by Harry G. Frankfurt (2005)
- Military Power: Explaining Victory and Defeat in Modern Battle by Stephen Biddle (2004)
- The Ulama in Contemporary Islam by The Ulama in Contemporary Islam: Custodians of Change (2002)
- QED: The Strange Theory of Light and Matter by Richard Feynman (1985)
- Islamic Revival in British India by Barbara D. Metcalf (1982)
- Philosophy and the Mirror of Nature by Richard Rorty (1979)
- Anatomy of Criticism by Northrop Frye (1957)
- The Wilhelm/Baynes translation of the I Ching, Bollingen Series XIX. First copyright 1950, 27th printing 1997.
- The Hero With a Thousand Faces by Joseph Campbell (1949)
- The Open Society and Its Enemies by Karl Popper (1945)
- How to Solve It by George Polya (1945)
- Atomic Energy for Military Purposes by Henry DeWolf Smyth (1945)
- The Meaning of Relativity by Albert Einstein (1922)

== Notable authors ==
- Jim Al-Khalili
- Mary Beard
- Ruha Benjamin
- Anne Case
- Eric H. Cline
- Edwidge Danticat
- Angus Deaton
- Albert Einstein
- Harry G. Frankfurt
- Claudia Goldin
- Annette Gordon-Reed
- Sarah Blaffer Hrdy
- Carl Jung
- Adrienne Mayor
- Marietje Schaake
- Robert Shiller
- Anne Marie Slaughter
- Marion Turner
- Neil deGrasse Tyson
- Virginia Woolf
