= Recommender system =

System to predict users' preferences

A recommender system, also called a recommendation engine or content discovery platform is a type of information filtering system that aims to suggest items most relevant for some input or to a particular user. In the context of social media, search engines, and other online services, a recommender system for a given service might sometimes informally but erroneously be referred to as the service's "algorithm". The use of recommender systems is pervasive, with commonly recognised examples including the generation of playlists for video and music streaming services, product recommendations for e-commerce platforms, and topics and individual items posted on social media platforms and the open web. Online services employ machine learning or specialized deep learning recommendation models (DLRMs) that analyze user behavior and preferences to generate personalized content feeds for millions of users at any moment. The value of these systems becomes particularly evident in scenarios where users must select from a large number of options, such as products, media, or content. Suggestions are typically designed to shorten or work as a substitute for decision-making processes, including the selection of a product, musical selection, or online news source to read.

== Overview ==
Recommender systems usually make use of either or both collaborative filtering and content-based filtering, as well as other systems such as knowledge-based systems. Collaborative filtering approaches build a model from a user's past behavior (e.g., items previously purchased or selected and/or numerical ratings given to those items) as well as similar decisions made by other users. This model is then used to predict items (or ratings for items) that the user may have an interest in. Content-based filtering approaches utilize a series of discrete, pre-tagged characteristics of an item in order to recommend additional items with similar properties.

=== Example ===
The differences between collaborative and content-based filtering can be demonstrated by comparing two early music recommender systems, Last.fm and Pandora Radio.

- Last.fm creates a "station" of recommended songs by observing what bands and individual tracks the user has listened to on a regular basis and comparing those against the listening behavior of other users. Last.fm will play tracks that do not appear in the user's library, but are often played by other users with similar interests. As this approach leverages the behavior of users, it is an example of a collaborative filtering technique.
- Pandora uses the properties of a song or artist (a subset of the 450 attributes provided by the Music Genome Project) to seed a "station" that plays music with similar properties. User feedback is used to refine the station's results, deemphasizing certain attributes when a user "dislikes" a particular song and emphasizing other attributes when a user "likes" a song. This is an example of a content-based approach.

Each type of system has its strengths and weaknesses. In the above example, Last.fm requires a large amount of information about a user to make accurate recommendations. This is an example of the cold start problem, and is common in collaborative filtering systems. Whereas Pandora needs very little information to start, it is far more limited in scope (for example, it can only make recommendations that are similar to the original seed).

=== Alternative implementations ===
Recommender systems are a useful alternative to search algorithms since they help users discover items they might not have found otherwise. Of note, recommender systems are often implemented using search engines indexing non-traditional data. In some cases, like in the Gonzalez v. Google Supreme Court case, may argue that search and recommendation algorithms are different technologies.

Recommender systems have been the focus of several granted patents, and there are more than 50 software libraries that support the development of recommender systems including LensKit, RecBole, ReChorus and RecPack.

== History ==
Elaine Rich created the first recommender system in 1979, called Grundy. She looked for a way to recommend users books they might like. Her idea was to create a system that asks users specific questions and classifies them into classes of preferences, or "stereotypes", depending on their answers. Depending on users' stereotype membership, they would then get recommendations for books they might like.

Another early recommender system, called a "digital bookshelf", was described in a 1990 technical report by Jussi Karlgren at Columbia University, and implemented at scale and worked through in technical reports and publications from 1994 onwards by Jussi Karlgren, then at SICS, and research groups led by Pattie Maes at MIT, Will Hill at Bellcore, and Paul Resnick, also at MIT, whose work with GroupLens was awarded the 2010 ACM Software Systems Award.

Montaner provided the first overview of recommender systems from an intelligent agent perspective. Gediminas Adomavicius provided a new, alternate overview of recommender systems. Herlocker provides an additional overview of evaluation techniques for recommender systems, and Beel et al. discussed the problems of offline evaluations. Beel et al. have also provided literature surveys on available research paper recommender systems and existing challenges.

== Approaches ==
=== Collaborative filtering ===
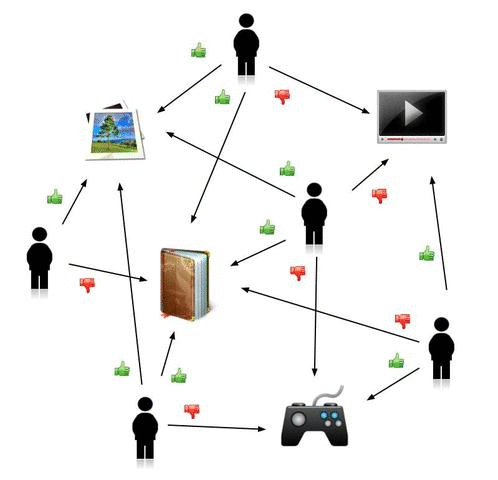
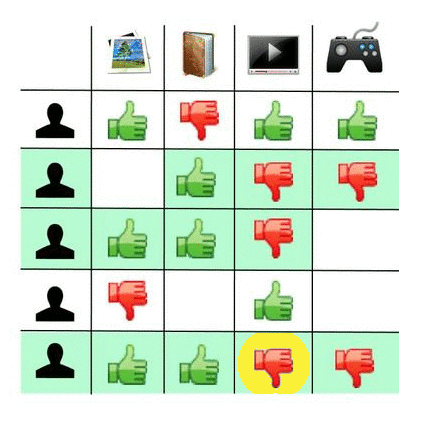
An example of predicting of the user's rating using collaborative filtering.
- Left: At first, people rate different items (like videos, images, games).
- Right: After that, the system makes predictions about a user's rating for an item which they have not personally rated yet. These predictions are built upon the existing ratings of other users, who have similar ratings with the active user. For instance, in our case the system has made a prediction, that the user in the bottom left of the network will not like the video.

One approach to the design of recommender systems that has wide use is collaborative filtering. Collaborative filtering is based on the assumption that people who agreed in the past will agree in the future, and that they will like similar kinds of items as they liked in the past. The system generates recommendations using only information about rating profiles for different users or items. By locating peer users/items with a rating history similar to the current user or item, they generate recommendations using this neighborhood.

The collaborative filtering approach does not rely on machine analyzable content and therefore it is capable of accurately recommending complex items such as movies without requiring an "understanding" of the item itself. Many algorithms have been used in measuring user similarity or item similarity in recommender systems. For example, the k-nearest neighbor (k-NN) approach and the Pearson Correlation as first implemented by Allen.

Collaborative filtering approaches often suffer from three problems: cold start, scalability, and sparsity.

- Cold start: For a new user or item, there is not enough data to make accurate recommendations. Note: one commonly implemented solution to this problem is the multi-armed bandit algorithm.
- Scalability: There are millions of users and products in many of the environments in which these systems make recommendations. Thus, a large amount of computation power is often necessary to calculate recommendations.
- Sparsity: The number of items sold on major e-commerce sites is extremely large. The most active users will only have rated a small subset of the overall database. Thus, even the most popular items have very few ratings.

Social networking services have used collaborative filtering to recommend new friends, groups, and other social connections by examining the network of connections between a user and their friends.

=== Content-based filtering ===
Another common approach when designing recommender systems is content-based filtering. Content-based filtering methods are based on a description of the item and a profile of the user's preferences. These methods are best suited to situations where there is known data on an item (name, location, description, etc.), but not on the user. Content-based recommenders treat recommendation as a user-specific classification problem and learn a classifier for the user's likes and dislikes based on an item's features.

In this system, keywords or, for images and video, vision embeddings for representation of the content as vectors similarly to vision language models or other deep learning-based computer vision techniques, are used to describe the items, and a user profile is built to indicate the type of item this user likes according to the embeddings the user spends the most time on. In other words, these algorithms try to recommend items similar to those that a user liked in the past, spends the most time on, or is examining in the present. It does not rely on a user sign-in mechanism to generate this often temporary profile. In particular, various candidate items are compared with items previously rated by the user by likes or watch time, and the best-matching items are recommended. This approach has its roots in information retrieval and information filtering research. Deep learning-based content filtering systems are the most pervasive and effective recommendation systems, used by major social media platforms such as Meta's and X/Twitter. They do not require users to manually tag posts with hashtags. Posts can be associated with users by comparing their embeddings with content embeddings via cosine difference. In its present form, it uses a specialized Deep Learning Recommendation Model (DLRM) that uses several billion parameters, up to 150 Billion for Meta's which is similar in size to some contemporary Large Language Models. X/Twitter's recommendation model uses a transformer, not unlike contemporary Large Language Models. These are run on contemporary general purpose graphical processing units, or custom processors.

To create a user profile, the system mostly focuses on two types of information:

1. A model of the user's preference.
2. A history of the user's interaction with the recommender system.

Basically, these methods use an item profile (i.e., a set of discrete attributes and features) characterizing the item within the system. To abstract the features of the items in the system, an item presentation algorithm is applied. A widely used algorithm is the tf–idf representation (also called vector space representation). The system creates a content-based profile of users based on a weighted vector of item features. The weights denote the importance of each feature to the user and can be computed from individually rated content vectors using a variety of techniques. Simple approaches use the average values of the rated item vector while other sophisticated methods use machine learning techniques such as Bayesian Classifiers, cluster analysis, decision trees, and artificial neural networks in order to estimate the probability that the user is going to like the item. Watch time can be used as a primary indicator of whether the user likes a post, and the posts can be clustered and associated in several ways via social graphs and techniques similar to the concept of embeddings in machine learning. Posts can be ranked with a dedicated model, and ranking and recommendation models can be used together in a ranking and recommendation system. Recommendation systems can have two towers: one with the user profile as an embedding and another for items or posts also as embeddings. Both types of embeddings can be generated from users and posts by specialized embedding models and then the differences between the two types of embeddings can be computed with cosine difference to match users to items. Then a ranking model can be used to show a feed that is diverse as it is scrolled that does not cluster together similar posts.

A key issue with content-based filtering is whether the system can learn user preferences from users' actions regarding one content source and use them across other content types. When the system is limited to recommending content of the same type as the user is already using, the value from the recommendation system is significantly less than when other content types from other services can be recommended. For example, recommending news articles based on news browsing is useful. Still, it would be much more useful when music, videos, products, discussions, etc., from different services, can be recommended based on news browsing. To overcome this, most content-based recommender systems now use some form of the hybrid system.

Content-based recommender systems can also include opinion-based recommender systems. In some cases, users are allowed to leave text reviews or feedback on the items. These user-generated texts are implicit data for the recommender system because they are potentially rich resources of both feature/aspects of the item and users' evaluation/sentiment to the item. Features extracted from the user-generated reviews are improved metadata of items, because as they also reflect aspects of the item like metadata, extracted features are widely concerned by the users. Sentiments extracted from the reviews can be seen as users' rating scores on the corresponding features. Popular approaches of opinion-based recommender system utilize various techniques including text mining, information retrieval, sentiment analysis (see also Multimodal sentiment analysis) and deep learning.

=== Hybrid recommendations approaches ===
Most recommender systems now use a hybrid approach, combining collaborative filtering, content-based filtering, and other approaches. Hybrid approaches can be implemented in several ways: by making content-based and collaborative-based predictions separately and then combining them; by adding content-based capabilities to a collaborative-based approach (and vice versa); or by unifying the approaches into one model. Several studies that empirically compared the performance of the hybrid with the pure collaborative and content-based methods and demonstrated that the hybrid methods can provide more accurate recommendations than pure approaches. These methods can also be used to overcome some of the common problems in recommender systems such as cold start and the sparsity problem, as well as the knowledge engineering bottleneck in knowledge-based approaches.

Netflix uses a hybrid recommender systems to make recommendations by comparing the watching and searching habits of similar users (i.e., collaborative filtering) as well as by offering movies that share characteristics with films that a user has rated highly (content-based filtering).

Some hybridization techniques include:

- Weighted: Combining the score of different recommendation components numerically.
- Switching: Choosing among recommendation components and applying the selected one.
- Mixed: Recommendations from different recommenders are presented together to give the recommendation.
- Cascade: Recommenders are given strict priority, with the lower priority ones breaking ties in the scoring of the higher ones.
- Meta-level: One recommendation technique is applied and produces some sort of model, which is then the input used by the next technique.

== Technologies ==
=== Session-based recommender systems ===
These recommender systems use the interactions of a user within a session to generate recommendations. Session-based recommender systems are used at YouTube and Amazon. These are particularly useful when history (such as past clicks, purchases) of a user is not available or not relevant in the current user session. Domains where session-based recommendations are particularly relevant include video, e-commerce, travel, music and more. Most instances of session-based recommender systems rely on the sequence of recent interactions within a session without requiring any additional details (historical, demographic) of the user. Techniques for session-based recommendations are mainly based on generative sequential models such as recurrent neural networks, transformers, and other deep-learning-based approaches.

=== Reinforcement learning for recommender systems ===
The recommendation problem can be seen as a special instance of a reinforcement learning problem whereby the user is the environment upon which the agent, the recommendation system acts upon in order to receive a reward, for instance, a click or engagement by the user. One aspect of reinforcement learning that is of particular use in the area of recommender systems is the fact that the models or policies can be learned by providing a reward to the recommendation agent. This is in contrast to traditional learning techniques which rely on supervised learning approaches that are less flexible, reinforcement learning recommendation techniques allow to potentially train models that can be optimized directly on metrics of engagement, and user interest.

=== Multi-criteria recommender systems ===
Multi-criteria recommender systems (MCRS) can be defined as recommender systems that incorporate preference information upon multiple criteria. Instead of developing recommendation techniques based on a single criterion value, the overall preference of user u for the item i, these systems try to predict a rating for unexplored items of u by exploiting preference information on multiple criteria that affect this overall preference value. Several researchers approach MCRS as a multi-criteria decision making (MCDM) problem, and apply MCDM methods and techniques to implement MCRS systems. See this chapter for an extended introduction.

=== Risk-aware recommender systems ===
The majority of existing approaches to recommender systems focus on recommending the most relevant content to users using contextual information, yet do not take into account the risk of disturbing the user with unwanted notifications. It is important to consider the risk of upsetting the user by pushing recommendations in certain circumstances, for instance, during a professional meeting, early morning, or late at night. Therefore, the performance of the recommender system depends in part on the degree to which it has incorporated the risk into the recommendation process. One option to manage this issue is DRARS, a system which models the context-aware recommendation as a bandit problem. This system combines a content-based technique and a contextual bandit algorithm.

=== Mobile recommender systems ===
Mobile recommender systems make use of internet-accessing smartphones to offer personalized, context-sensitive recommendations. This is a particularly difficult area of research as mobile data is more complex than data that recommender systems often have to deal with. It is heterogeneous, noisy, requires spatial and temporal auto-correlation, and has validation and generality problems.

There are three factors that could affect the mobile recommender systems and the accuracy of prediction results: the context, the recommendation method and privacy. Additionally, mobile recommender systems suffer from a transplantation problem – recommendations may not apply in all regions (for instance, it would be unwise to recommend a recipe in an area where all of the ingredients may not be available).

One example of a mobile recommender system are the approaches taken by companies such as Uber and Lyft to generate driving routes for taxi drivers in a city. This system uses GPS data of the routes that taxi drivers take while working, which includes location (latitude and longitude), time stamps, and operational status (with or without passengers). It uses this data to recommend a list of pickup points along a route, with the goal of optimizing occupancy times and profits.

=== Generative recommenders ===
Generative recommenders (GR) represent an approach that transforms recommendation tasks into sequential transduction problems, where user actions are treated like tokens in a generative modeling framework. In one method, known as HSTU (Hierarchical Sequential Transduction Units), high-cardinality, non-stationary, and streaming datasets are efficiently processed as sequences, enabling the model to learn from trillions of parameters and to handle user action histories orders of magnitude longer than before. By turning all of the system’s varied data into a single stream of tokens and using a custom self-attention approach instead of traditional neural network layers, generative recommenders make the model much simpler and less memory-hungry. As a result, it can improve recommendation quality in test simulations and in real-world tests, while being faster than previous Transformer-based systems when handling long lists of user actions. Ultimately, this approach allows the model’s performance to grow steadily as more computing power is used, laying a foundation for efficient and scalable “foundation models” for recommendations.

== Bridging-based algorithms ==
Bridging-based ranking (also called bridging-based algorithms or, more broadly, bridging systems) is a family of ranking and recommendation methods that promote items valued by people who usually disagree with one another, instead of items that maximize engagement.

=== Motivation and definition ===
Ovadya introduced the term in a 2022 report for the Belfer Center for Science and International Affairs. He argued that engagement-based ranking on platforms such as Facebook, YouTube and TikTok acts as a reward structure for society, and that it tends to reward divisive content, a "centrifugal" force with harmful effects on decision-making, cooperation and democratic health. Bridging-based ranking was proposed as a countervailing "centripetal" force that rewards content producing positive interactions across diverse audiences, including on divisive topics. The report contrasted bridging with other proposed reforms of ranking, such as reverse-chronological feeds, "middleware", and letting users choose their own ranking system, and argued that none of these stops rewarding those who seek to divide unless bridging is introduced. It recommended that platforms measure how much their products divide people using "bridging metrics", and that bridging, rather than engagement or chronological ordering, become the default.

Ovadya and Thorburn later generalized the idea to bridging systems: systems that increase mutual understanding and trust across divides, creating space for productive conflict, deliberation, or cooperation. They stress that bridging is not meant to eliminate conflict or make opinions homogeneous, and they give examples from three domains: recommender systems on social media, collective response systems such as Polis, and human-facilitated deliberation such as mini-publics. They survey several signals that can be used to operationalize bridging, including diverse approval (favoring content endorsed by people who usually disagree, which they consider the most promising signal), response bimodality (penalizing content whose ratings are polarized), models trained to predict positive interactions across divides, and survey- or classifier-based measures such as feeling thermometers or detectors of dehumanizing language. In practice, diverse approval is the most common operationalization; implementations differ in whether the groups of users are fixed in advance or learned from the data, and in how diversity of approval is quantified.

=== Community Notes ===
The best-known deployment of bridging-based ranking is Community Notes (originally called Birdwatch) on X, formerly Twitter, in which contributors attach explanatory notes to potentially misleading posts and rate one another's notes. Wojcik, Hilgard, Judd, Mocanu, Ragain, Fallin Hunzaker, Coleman and Baxter describe the matrix factorization model behind it. Each rating of note $n$ by user $u$ is modeled as

$$\hat{r}_{un} = \mu + i_u + i_n + f_u \cdot f_n,$$

where $\mu$ is a global intercept, $i_u$ captures the user's general leniency, $f_u$ and $f_n$ are latent factor vectors that capture the user's and the note's viewpoint, and the note intercept $i_n$ captures the helpfulness of the note beyond what is explained by rater viewpoints and leniency. Because agreement among like-minded raters is absorbed by the factor term, a note obtains a high intercept only if raters with different viewpoints find it helpful, and notes are ranked by their intercept. In the open-source implementation, one of the conditions for a note to be shown publicly is a note intercept of at least 0.40. In the evaluation by Wojcik, Hilgard, Judd, Mocanu, Ragain, Fallin Hunzaker, Coleman and Baxter, notes selected by the algorithm improved respondents' understanding compared with baselines, and, after deployment on Twitter, people who saw the selected notes were significantly less likely to reshare the annotated posts.

The need for such an algorithm is illustrated by a study by Allen, Martel and Rand of early Birdwatch data, which found that the partisanship of users was far more predictive of their judgments than the content of the tweets and notes, and that users were more likely to write negative evaluations of tweets posted by counter-partisans.

In 2025, Meta began testing Community Notes on Facebook, Instagram and Threads, initially using X's open-source algorithm; a note is published only when contributors who usually disagree both find it helpful, rather than by majority vote. TikTok launched a similar feature, Footnotes, in the United States in July 2025, also using a bridging algorithm that looks for agreement among users who usually hold different views.

=== Deliberation platforms ===
Bridging metrics are also used in online deliberation platforms (see wiki survey). In Polis, participants submit short statements and vote on statements written by others; the system clusters participants into opinion groups according to their votes and highlights statements on which there is rough consensus between groups. Polis has been used in government decision-making processes, most notably in Taiwan's vTaiwan platform. Its group-informed consensus metric multiplies, over all opinion groups, the estimated probability that a member of the group agrees with a statement; a single small group united against a statement can therefore prevent it from scoring highly even if all other groups support it.

Konya, Schirch, Irwin and Ovadya combined AI-assisted "collective dialogues" with bridging-based ranking to find points of consensus among the US public, and used them to draft policy guidelines for AI assistants on medical advice, vaccine information, and wars and conflicts; the resulting guidelines received 75–81% support across demographic divides. Konya, Thorburn, Almasri, Leshem, Procaccia, Schirch and Bakker applied a similar process, combining large language models with bridging-based ranking (both max–min agreement across groups and a latent factor model similar to that of Community Notes), with about 138 Israeli and Palestinian civil-society peacebuilders in 2024. It produced a set of collective statements, including joint demands to world leaders, each supported by at least 84% of participants on each side.

Bridging signals can also come from the content itself. In 2024, Jigsaw added experimental "bridging attributes" to its Perspective API: classifiers that detect qualities of comments, such as reasoning, personal stories and curiosity, that have been associated with more constructive conversation. Developers can use them to sort comments or select comments to highlight.

=== Formal analysis ===
Blair, de Raaij, Procaccia, Rubin-Toles, Shah, Si and Wang studied bridging metrics from the perspective of computational social choice. They noted that the metrics used by Polis and by the Remesh platform consider only connections between groups in a single, fixed partition of the participants, which may miss important divisions, and developed an axiomatic framework in which a statement's bridging score is averaged over the partitions induced by the votes on other statements. They showed that the Remesh metric is maximized when approval rates are equal across groups, whereas the Polis metric is maximized when the numbers of approvers in the groups are as equal as possible. Within this framework they proposed two new metrics, pairwise disagreement and p-mean bridging, each characterized by a set of axioms, and found in experiments on real voting data that both are more robust to sparse votes than the group-informed consensus metric of Polis.

=== Empirical evaluation ===
Evidence on the effectiveness of bridging-based fact-checking is mixed. Chuai, Tian, Pröllochs and Lenzini found no evidence that the roll-out of Community Notes significantly reduced engagement with misleading tweets, and suggested that notes may appear too late to affect the early and most viral stage of diffusion. In contrast, Slaughter, Peytavin, Ugander and Saveski analyzed time series for 40,078 posts with proposed notes and found that once a note is attached, posts receive significantly fewer reposts, likes, replies and views, and spread differently through the social network.

The requirement of cross-perspective agreement also limits coverage. De, Bakker, Baxter and Saveski reported that for 91% of posts on which at least one note was proposed, no note ultimately achieved enough support from diverse raters to be shown. They proposed Supernotes, in which a large language model synthesizes the existing notes on a post into candidate notes, and a consensus-oriented scoring step selects the candidate expected to be found helpful by raters with different viewpoints; in their experiments, participants rated Supernotes as significantly more helpful than the existing notes.

=== Related approaches ===
Other work modifies ranking objectives to reduce polarization without relying on diverse approval. Jia, Lam, Mai, Hancock and Bernstein proposed societal objective functions, which translate constructs from the social sciences, such as anti-democratic attitudes, into ranking objectives, and found that downranking posts with anti-democratic content reduced partisan animosity. Piccardi, Saveski, Jia, Hancock, Tsai and Bernstein used a browser extension and a large language model to rerank the X feeds of 1,256 participants for ten days during the 2024 US presidential campaign; decreasing or increasing exposure to posts expressing anti-democratic attitudes and partisan animosity shifted feelings toward the opposing party by more than two points on a 100-point feeling thermometer.

=== Criticism and limitations ===
Ovadya and Thorburn list several risks of bridging systems: fake or coordinated accounts may try to game them; bridging may conflict with engagement and relevance, making adoption costly for companies; bridging metrics may lack validity or be subject to Goodhart's law; shared prejudices may form harmful "bridges"; and an emphasis on agreement may suppress the productive conflict that drives social change. They also note that bridging addresses how attention is allocated, not material sources of division such as economic inequality. Ovadya's original report likewise describes bridging-based ranking as "not a silver bullet".

== The Netflix Prize ==
One of the events that energized research in recommender systems was the Netflix Prize. From 2006 to 2009, Netflix sponsored a competition, offering a grand prize of $1,000,000 to the team that could take an offered dataset of over 100 million movie ratings and return recommendations that were 10% more accurate than those offered by the company's existing recommender system. This competition energized the search for new and more accurate algorithms. On September 21, 2009, the grand prize of US$1,000,000 was given to the BellKor's Pragmatic Chaos team using tiebreaking rules.

The most accurate algorithm in 2007 used an ensemble method of 107 different algorithmic approaches, blended into a single prediction. As stated by the winners, Bell et al.:

Predictive accuracy is substantially improved when blending multiple predictors. Our experience is that most efforts should be concentrated in deriving substantially different approaches, rather than refining a single technique. Consequently, our solution is an ensemble of many methods.

Many benefits accrued to the web due to the Netflix project. Some teams have taken their technology and applied it to other markets. Some members from the team that finished second place founded Gravity R&D, a recommendation engine that's active in the RecSys community. 4-Tell, Inc. created a Netflix project–derived solution for ecommerce websites.

A number of privacy issues arose around the dataset offered by Netflix for the Netflix Prize competition. Although the data sets were anonymized in order to preserve customer privacy, in 2007 two researchers from the University of Texas were able to identify individual users by matching the data sets with film ratings on the Internet Movie Database (IMDb). As a result, in December 2009, an anonymous Netflix user sued Netflix in Doe v. Netflix, alleging that Netflix had violated United States fair trade laws and the Video Privacy Protection Act by releasing the datasets. This, as well as concerns from the Federal Trade Commission, led to the cancellation of a second Netflix Prize competition in 2010.

== Evaluation ==
=== Performance measures ===
Evaluation is important in assessing the effectiveness of recommendation algorithms. To measure the effectiveness of recommender systems, and compare different approaches, three types of evaluations are available: user studies, online evaluations (A/B tests), and offline evaluations.

The commonly used metrics are the mean squared error and root mean squared error, the latter having been used in the Netflix Prize. The information retrieval metrics such as precision and recall or discounted cumulative gain (DCG) are useful to assess the quality of a recommendation method. Diversity, novelty, and coverage are also considered as important aspects in evaluation. However, many of the classic evaluation measures are highly criticized.

Evaluating the performance of a recommendation algorithm on a fixed test dataset will always be extremely challenging as it is impossible to accurately predict the reactions of real users to the recommendations. Hence any metric that computes the effectiveness of an algorithm in offline data will be imprecise.

User studies are rather a small scale. A few dozens or hundreds of users are presented recommendations created by different recommendation approaches, and then the users judge which recommendations are best.

In A/B tests, recommendations are shown to typically thousands of users of a real product, and the recommender system randomly picks at least two different recommendation approaches to generate recommendations. The effectiveness is measured with implicit measures of effectiveness such as conversion rate or click-through rate.

Offline evaluations are based on historic data, e.g. a dataset that contains information about how users previously rated movies.

The effectiveness of recommendation approaches is then measured based on how well a recommendation approach can predict the users' ratings in the dataset. While a rating is an explicit expression of whether a user liked a movie, such information is not available in all domains. For instance, in the domain of citation recommender systems, users typically do not rate a citation or recommended article. In such cases, offline evaluations may use implicit measures of effectiveness. For instance, it may be assumed that a recommender system is effective that is able to recommend as many articles as possible that are contained in a research article's reference list. However, this kind of offline evaluations is seen critical by many researchers. For instance, it has been shown that results of offline evaluations have low correlation with results from user studies or A/B tests. A dataset popular for offline evaluation has been shown to contain duplicate data and thus to lead to wrong conclusions in the evaluation of algorithms. Often, results of so-called offline evaluations do not correlate with actually assessed user-satisfaction. This is probably because offline training is highly biased toward the highly reachable items, and offline testing data is highly influenced by the outputs of the online recommendation module. Researchers have concluded that the results of offline evaluations should be viewed critically.

=== Beyond accuracy ===
Typically, research on recommender systems is concerned with finding the most accurate recommendation algorithms. However, there are a number of factors that are also important.

- Diversity – Users tend to be more satisfied with recommendations when there is a higher intra-list diversity, e.g. items from different artists.
- Recommender persistence – In some situations, it is more effective to re-show recommendations, or let users re-rate items, than showing new items. There are several reasons for this. Users may ignore items when they are shown for the first time, for instance, because they had no time to inspect the recommendations carefully.
- Privacy – Recommender systems usually have to deal with privacy concerns because users have to reveal sensitive information. Building user profiles using collaborative filtering can be problematic from a privacy point of view. Many European countries have a strong culture of data privacy, and every attempt to introduce any level of user profiling can result in a negative customer response. Much research has been conducted on ongoing privacy issues in this space. The Netflix Prize is particularly notable for the detailed personal information released in its dataset. Ramakrishnan et al. have conducted an extensive overview of the trade-offs between personalization and privacy and found that the combination of weak ties (an unexpected connection that provides serendipitous recommendations) and other data sources can be used to uncover identities of users in an anonymized dataset.
- User demographics – Beel et al. found that user demographics may influence how satisfied users are with recommendations. In their paper they show that elderly users tend to be more interested in recommendations than younger users.
- Robustness – When users can participate in the recommender system, the issue of fraud must be addressed.
- Serendipity – Serendipity is a measure of "how surprising the recommendations are". For instance, a recommender system that recommends milk to a customer in a grocery store might be perfectly accurate, but it is not a good recommendation because it is an obvious item for the customer to buy. "[Serendipity] serves two purposes: First, the chance that users lose interest because the choice set is too uniform decreases. Second, these items are needed for algorithms to learn and improve themselves".
- Trust – A recommender system is of little value for a user if the user does not trust the system. Trust can be built by a recommender system by explaining how it generates recommendations, and why it recommends an item.
- Labelling – User satisfaction with recommendations may be influenced by the labeling of the recommendations. For instance, in the cited study click-through rate (CTR) for recommendations labeled as "Sponsored" were lower (CTR=5.93%) than CTR for identical recommendations labeled as "Organic" (CTR=8.86%). Recommendations with no label performed best (CTR=9.87%) in that study.

=== Reproducibility ===
Recommender systems are notoriously difficult to evaluate offline, with some researchers claiming that this has led to a reproducibility crisis in recommender systems publications. The topic of reproducibility seems to be a recurrent issue in some Machine Learning publication venues, but does not have a considerable effect beyond the world of scientific publication. In the context of recommender systems a 2019 paper surveyed a small number of hand-picked publications applying deep learning or neural methods to the top-k recommendation problem, published in top conferences (SIGIR, KDD, WWW, RecSys, IJCAI), has shown that on average less than 40% of articles could be reproduced by the authors of the survey, with as little as 14% in some conferences. The articles considers a number of potential problems in today's research scholarship and suggests improved scientific practices in that area. More recent work on benchmarking a set of the same methods came to qualitatively very different results whereby neural methods were found to be among the best performing methods. Deep learning and neural methods for recommender systems have been used in the winning solutions in several recent recommender system challenges, WSDM, RecSys Challenge. Moreover, neural and deep learning methods are widely used in industry where they are extensively tested. The topic of reproducibility is not new in recommender systems. By 2011, Ekstrand, Konstan, et al. criticized that "it is currently difficult to reproduce and extend recommender systems research results," and that evaluations are "not handled consistently". Konstan and Adomavicius conclude that "the Recommender Systems research community is facing a crisis where a significant number of papers present results that contribute little to collective knowledge [...] often because the research lacks the [...] evaluation to be properly judged and, hence, to provide meaningful contributions." As a consequence, much research about recommender systems can be considered as not reproducible. Hence, operators of recommender systems find little guidance in the current research for answering the question, which recommendation approaches to use in a recommender systems. Said and Bellogín conducted a study of papers published in the field, as well as benchmarked some of the most popular frameworks for recommendation and found large inconsistencies in results, even when the same algorithms and data sets were used. Some researchers demonstrated that minor variations in the recommendation algorithms or scenarios led to strong changes in the effectiveness of a recommender system. They conclude that seven actions are necessary to improve the current situation: "(1) survey other research fields and learn from them, (2) find a common understanding of reproducibility, (3) identify and understand the determinants that affect reproducibility, (4) conduct more comprehensive experiments (5) modernize publication practices, (6) foster the development and use of recommendation frameworks, and (7) establish best-practice guidelines for recommender-systems research."

== Artificial intelligence applications in recommendation ==
Artificial intelligence (AI) applications in recommendation systems are the advanced methodologies that leverage AI technologies, to enhance the performance recommendation engines. The AI-based recommender can analyze complex data sets, learning from user behavior, preferences, and interactions to generate highly accurate and personalized content or product suggestions. The integration of AI in recommendation systems has marked a significant evolution from traditional recommendation methods. Traditional methods often relied on inflexible algorithms that could suggest items based on general user trends or apparent similarities in content. In comparison, AI-powered systems have the capability to detect patterns and subtle distinctions that may be overlooked by traditional methods. These systems can adapt to specific individual preferences, thereby offering recommendations that are more aligned with individual user needs. This approach marks a shift towards more personalized, user-centric suggestions.

Recommendation systems widely adopt AI techniques such as machine learning, deep learning, and natural language processing. These advanced methods enhance system capabilities to predict user preferences and deliver personalized content more accurately. Each technique contributes uniquely. The following sections will introduce specific AI models utilized by a recommendation system by illustrating their theories and functionalities.

=== KNN-based collaborative filters ===
Collaborative filtering (CF) is one of the most commonly used recommendation system algorithms. It generates personalized suggestions for users based on explicit or implicit behavioral patterns to form predictions. Specifically, it relies on external feedback such as star ratings, purchasing history and so on to make judgments. CF make predictions about users' preference based on similarity measurements. Essentially, the underlying theory is: "if user A is similar to user B, and if A likes item C, then it is likely that B also likes item C."

There are many models available for collaborative filtering. For AI-applied collaborative filtering, a common model is called K-nearest neighbors. The ideas are as follows:

1. Data Representation: Create a n-dimensional space where each axis represents a user's trait (ratings, purchases, etc.). Represent the user as a point in that space.
2. Statistical Distance: 'Distance' measures how far apart users are in this space. See statistical distance for computational details
3. Identifying Neighbors: Based on the computed distances, find k nearest neighbors of the user to which we want to make recommendations
4. Forming Predictive Recommendations: The system will analyze the similar preference of the k neighbors. The system will make recommendations based on that similarity

=== Neural networks ===
An artificial neural network (ANN), is a deep learning model structure which aims to mimic a human brain. They comprise a series of neurons, each responsible for receiving and processing information transmitted from other interconnected neurons. Similar to a human brain, these neurons will change activation state based on incoming signals (training input and backpropagated output), allowing the system to adjust activation weights during the network learning phase. ANN is usually designed to be a black-box model. Unlike regular machine learning where the underlying theoretical components are formal and rigid, the collaborative effects of neurons are not entirely clear, but modern experiments has shown the predictive power of ANN.

ANN is widely used in recommendation systems for its power to utilize various data. Other than feedback data, ANN can incorporate non-feedback data which are too intricate for collaborative filtering to learn, and the unique structure allows ANN to identify extra signal from non-feedback data to boost user experience. Following are some examples:

- Time and Seasonality: what specify time and date or a season that a user interacts with the platform
- User Navigation Patterns: sequence of pages visited, time spent on different parts of a website, mouse movement, etc.
- External Social Trends: information from outer social media

==== Two-Tower Model ====
The Two-Tower model is a neural architecture commonly employed in large-scale recommendation systems, particularly for candidate retrieval tasks. It consists of two neural networks:

- User Tower: Encodes user-specific features, such as interaction history or demographic data.
- Item Tower: Encodes item-specific features, such as metadata or content embeddings.

The outputs of the two towers are fixed-length embeddings that represent users and items in a shared vector space. A similarity metric, such as dot product or cosine similarity, is used to measure relevance between a user and an item.

This model is highly efficient for large datasets as embeddings can be pre-computed for items, allowing rapid retrieval during inference. It is often used in conjunction with ranking models for end-to-end recommendation pipelines.

=== Natural language processing ===
Natural language processing is a series of AI algorithms to make natural human language accessible and analyzable to a machine. It is a fairly modern technique inspired by the growing amount of textual information. For application in recommendation system, a common case is the Amazon customer review. Amazon will analyze the feedbacks comments from each customer and report relevant data to other customers for reference. The recent years have witnessed the development of various text analysis models, including latent semantic analysis (LSA), singular value decomposition (SVD), latent Dirichlet allocation (LDA), etc. Their uses have consistently aimed to provide customers with more precise and tailored recommendations.

== See also ==
- Algorithmic radicalization
- ACM Conference on Recommender Systems
- Cold start
- Collaborative filtering
- Collective intelligence
- Configurator
- Content moderation
- Enterprise bookmarking
- Filter bubble
- Information filtering system
- Information explosion
- K.G.M. v. Meta et al.
- Media monitoring service
- Pattern recognition
- Personalized marketing
- Personalized search
- Preference elicitation
- Product finder
- Rating site
- Reputation management
- Reputation system
