= C. Pandu Rangan =

Indian computer scientist (born 1955)

Chandrasekharan Pandu Rangan
- Born: September 20, 1955 (age 70); Madras, Tamil Nadu, India
- Education: B.Sc (M), M.Sc (EE), PhD (Applied Mathematics)
- Alma mater: Indian Institute of Science; University of Madras
- Occupations: Professor and researcher
- Children: 2
- Scientific career
- Fields: Computer science
- Workplaces: Indian Institute of Technology Madras

Chandrasekaran Pandurangan (born September 20, 1955) is a computer scientist and academic professor of the Computer Science and Engineering Department at Indian Institute of Technology - Madras (IITM). He mainly focuses on the design of pragmatic algorithms, graph theory and cryptography.

== Early life ==
Pandu Rangan was born on September 20, 1955, to S.R. Chandrasekharan in Madras, India. He is married and has two children.

== Education ==
Pandu Rangan completed his B.Sc. from University of Madras in 1975. After obtaining B.Sc., he received his M.Sc. from the same university in 1977. He completed his PhD from IISc, Bangalore in 1984.

== Research interests ==
Pandu Rangan has published over two hundred research papers in the following areas of computer science and engineering:

- Restricting the problem domain
- Approximate algorithm design
- Randomized algorithms
- Parallel and VLSI algorithms
- Applied cryptography
- Secure multi-part computation
- Game theory and
- Graph theory

Problems of practical interest in graph theory, combinatorics and computational geometry were his main interests in research. In cryptology his current focus is on secure message transmission and provable security of cryptographic protocols / primitives.

== Awards and honours ==
- In 2018, he won Institute Chair Professor at IIT Madras.
- Fellow, Indian National Academy of Engineering, (2006).
- Member of the Board of Directors of International Association for Cryptologic Research (IACR), (2002-2005).
- Member, Board of Directors, Society for Electronics Transaction and Security (SETS), (2005-2007).
- Member, Editorial Board, Lecture Notes in Computer Science Series (LNCS Series), Springer-Verlag, Germany, (2005-2008).
- Member, Editorial Board, Journal of Parallel and Distributed Computing, (2005-2008).

== Bibliography ==
- K. Srinathan, M. V. N. Ashwin Kumar, C. Pandu Rangan: Asynchronous Secure Communication Tolerating Mixed Adversaries. Advances in Cryptology – ASIACRYPT 2002, 8th International Conference on the Theory and Application of Cryptology and Information Security, Queenstown, New Zealand, 1–5 December 2002: Pages 224-242
- K. Srinathan, Arvind Narayanan, C. Pandu Rangan: Optimal Perfectly Secure Message Transmission. Advances in Cryptology – CRYPTO 2004, 24th Annual International CryptologyConference, Santa Barbara, California, USA, 15–19 August 2004: Pages 545-561
- Kannan Srinathan, N. R. Prasad, C. Pandu Rangan: On the Optimal Communication Complexity of Multiphase Protocols for Perfect Communication. 2007 IEEE Symposium on Security and Privacy (S&P 2007), 20–23 May 2007, Oakland, California, USA, 2007: Pages 311-320
- Kannan Srinathan, Arpita Patra, Ashish Choudhary, C. Pandu Rangan: Probabilistic Perfectly Reliable and Secure Message Transmission - Possibility, Feasibility and Optimality. Progress in Cryptology – INDOCRYPT 2007, 8th International Conference on Cryptology in India, Chennai, India, 9–13 December 2007: Pages 101-122
- S. Sharmila Deva Selvi, S. Sree Vivek, Deepanshu Shukla, C. Pandu Rangan: Efficient and Provably Secure Certificateless Multi-receiver Signcryption. Provable Security, Second International Conference, ProvSec 2008, Shanghai, China, 30 October – 1 November 2008: Pages 52–67
- Bhavani Shankar, Prasant Gopal, Kannan Srinathan, C. Pandu Rangan: Unconditionally reliable message transmission in directed networks. Proceedings of the Nineteenth Annual ACM-SIAM Symposium on Discrete Algorithms, SODA 2008, San Francisco, California, USA, 20–22 January 2008. SIAM: Pages 1048-1055
- Arpita Patra, Ashish Choudhary, C. Pandu Rangan: Round Efficient Unconditionally Secure Multiparty Computation Protocol. Progress in Cryptology – INDOCRYPT 2008, 9th International Conference on Cryptology in India, Kharagpur, India, 14–17 December 2008: Pages 185-199
- S. Sharmila Deva Selvi, S. Sree Vivek, C. Pandu Rangan: Breaking and Fixing of an Identity Based Multi-Signcryption Scheme. Provable Security, Third International Conference, ProvSec 2009, Guangzhou, China, 11–13 November 2009: Pages 61–75
- S. Sharmila Deva Selvi, S. Sree Vivek, J. Shriram, S. Kalaivani, C. Pandu Rangan: Identity Based Aggregate Signcryption Schemes. Progress in Cryptology – INDOCRYPT 2009, 10th International Conference on Cryptology in India, New Delhi, India, 13–16 December 2009: Pages 378-397
- Arpita Patra, Ashish Choudhary, C. Pandu Rangan: Round Efficient Unconditionally Secure MPC and Multiparty Set Intersection with Optimal Resilience. Progress in Cryptology – INDOCRYPT 2009, 10th International Conference on Cryptology in India, New Delhi, India, 13–16 December 2009: Pages 398-417
- Arpita Patra, Ashish Choudhary, Tal Rabin, C. Pandu Rangan: The Round Complexity of Verifiable Secret Sharing Revisited. Advances in Cryptology – CRYPTO 2009, 29th Annual International Cryptology Conference, Santa Barbara, CA, USA, 16–20 August 2009: Pages 487-504
- Ranjit Kumaresan, Arpita Patra, C. Pandu Rangan: The Round Complexity of Verifiable Secret Sharing: The Statistical Case. Advances in Cryptology – ASIACRYPT 2010 - 16th International Conference on the Theory and Application of Cryptology and Information Security, Singapore, 5–9 December 2010: Pages 431-447
- S. Sharmila Deva Selvi, S. Sree Vivek, C. Pandu Rangan: Identity Based Public Verifiable Signcryption Scheme. Provable Security - 4th International Conference, ProvSec 2010, Malacca, Malaysia, 13–15 October 2010: Pages 244-260
- S. Sharmila Deva Selvi, S. Sree Vivek, Dhinakaran Vinayagamurthy, C. Pandu Rangan: ID Based Signcryption Scheme in Standard Model. Provable Security - 6th International Conference, ProvSec 2012, Chengdu, China, 26–28 September 2012: Pages 35–52
- S. Sree Vivek, S. Sharmila Deva Selvi, Layamrudhaa Renganathan Venkatesan, C. Pandu Rangan: Efficient, Pairing-Free, Authenticated Identity Based Key Agreement in a Single Round. Provable Security - 7th International Conference, ProvSec 2013, Melaka, Malaysia, 23–25 October 2013: Pages 38–58
- Arpita Patra, Ashish Choudhury, C. Pandu Rangan: Efficient Asynchronous Verifiable Secret Sharing and Multiparty Computation. Journal of Cryptology Volume 28, Number 1, January 2015: Pages 49–109 (2015)
- Priyanka Bose, Dipanjan Das, Chandrasekaran Pandu Rangan: Constant Size Ring Signature Without Random Oracle. Information Security and Privacy - 20th Australasian Conference, ACISP 2015, Brisbane, QLD, Australia, 29 June – 1 July 2015: Pages 230-247
- Suvradip Chakraborty, Goutam Paul, C. Pandu Rangan: Forward-Secure Authenticated Symmetric Key Exchange Protocol: New Security Model and Secure Construction. Provable Security - 9th International Conference, ProvSec 2015, Kanazawa, Japan, 24–26 November 2015: Pages 149-166
- Sree Vivek Sivanandam, S. Sharmila Deva Selvi, Akshayaram Srinivasan, Chandrasekaran Pandu Rangan: Stronger public key encryption system withstanding RAM scraper like attacks. Security and Communication Networks Volume 9, Number 12, January 2016: Pages 1650-1662
- Kunwar Singh, C. Pandu Rangan, A. K. Banerjee: Lattice-based identity-based resplittable threshold public key encryption scheme. International Journal of Computer Mathematics, Volume 93, Number 2, 2016: Pages 289-307
- K. Srinathan, C. Pandu Rangan, Moti Yung: Progress in Cryptology – INDOCRYPT 2007, 8th International Conference on Cryptology in India, Chennai, India, 9–13 December 2007, Proceedings. Lecture Notes in Computer Science 4859, Springer 2007, ISBN 978-3-540-77025-1.
- C. Pandu Rangan, Cunsheng Ding: Progress in Cryptology – INDOCRYPT 2001, Second International Conference on Cryptology in India, Chennai, India, 16–20 December 2001, Proceedings. Lecture Notes in Computer Science 2247, Springer 2001, ISBN 3-540-43010-5.
- C. Pandu Rangan, Venkatesh Raman, Ramaswamy Ramanujam: Foundations of Software Technology and Theoretical Computer Science, 19th Conference, Chennai, India, 13–15 December 1999, Proceedings. Lecture Notes in Computer Science 1738, Springer 1999, ISBN 3-540-66836-5.
- Alok Aggarwal, C. Pandu Rangan: Algorithms and Computation, 10th International Symposium, ISAAC '99, Chennai, India, 16–18 December 1999, Proceedings. Lecture Notes in Computer Science 1741, Springer 1999, ISBN 3-540-66916-7.
