= Vitaly Shmatikov =

American computer scientist

- Education: Stanford University (PhD)
- Scientific career
- Fields: Computer Security
- Workplaces: Cornell Tech
- Thesis: Finite-State Analysis of Security Protocols (2000)
- Doctoral advisor: John C. Mitchell

Vitaly Shmatikov is a professor in computer security at Cornell Tech.

== Biography ==
Shmatikov obtained his M.S. in engineering-economic systems at Stanford University, and then Ph.D. in computer science from Stanford University in 2000 under the supervision of John C. Mitchell, where he wrote his dissertation on Finite-State Analysis of Security Protocols. He currently has over 100 publications in the area of computer security, privacy, and cryptography.

== Research ==
The Netflix Prize was a competition to predict how users would rate films based on their previous ratings of other films. The dataset contained data from 480,189 users who rated 17,770 movies. In 2008, with Arvind Narayanan, Shmatikov showed that it was possible to de-anonymize individual people from this dataset. To do this, Shmatikov used a second auxiliary dataset of various user's IMDb ratings. By correlating users who made similar reviews, it was possible to nearly perfectly de-identify several people who were present in both datasets. For this work, IEEE awarded Shmatikov the "Test of Time" award in 2019.

More recently Shmatikov has studied the privacy of machine learning. With Reza Shokri, Shmatikov introduced the first "Membership Inference" attacks on machine learning models. This allows an attacker to learn what data a machine learning model has been trained on.

Shmatikov has also studied how machine learning can be used to attack user privacy. For example, in 2016 he showed that "pixelization" used to obfuscate user's faces is insecure and it is still possible to identify people whose faces have been pixelated.

== Awards ==
Shmatikov received the Caspar Bowden PET Award for Outstanding Research in Privacy Enhancing Technologies in 2008, 2014, and 2018. He received the Test of Time award at IEEE S&P 2019, and a Test of Time award from the ACM Conference on Computer and Communications Security. In 2023 he received the Outstanding Paper Award at EMNLP 2023.
