= Information filtering system =

An information filtering system is a system that removes redundant or unwanted information from an information stream using (semi)automated or computerized methods prior to presentation to a human user. Its main goal is the management of the information overload and increment of the semantic signal-to-noise ratio. To do this the user's profile is compared to some reference characteristics. These characteristics may originate from the information item (the content-based approach) or the user's social environment (the collaborative filtering approach).

Whereas in information transmission signal processing filters are used against syntax-disrupting noise on the bit-level, the methods employed in information filtering act on the semantic level.

The range of machine methods employed builds on the same principles as those for information extraction. A notable application can be found in the field of email spam filters. Thus, it is not only the information explosion that necessitates some form of filters, but also inadvertently or maliciously introduced pseudo-information.

On the presentation level, information filtering takes the form of user-preferences-based newsfeeds, etc.

Recommender systems and content discovery platforms are active information filtering systems that attempt to present to the user information items (film, television, music, books, news, web pages) the user is interested in. These systems add information items to the information flowing towards the user, as opposed to removing information items from the information flow towards the user. Recommender systems typically use collaborative filtering approaches or a combination of the collaborative filtering and content-based filtering approaches, although content-based recommender systems do exist.

== History ==
Before the advent of the Internet, there are already several methods of filtering information; for instance, governments may control and restrict the flow of information in a given country by means of formal or informal censorship.

Another example of information filtering is the work done by newspaper editors and journalists who provide a service that selects the most valuable information for their clients i.e readers of books, magazines, newspapers, radio listeners and TV viewers. This filtering operation is also present in schools and universities where there is a selection of information to provide assistance based on academic criteria to customers of this service, the students. With the advent of the Internet it is possible for anyone to publish anything they wish at a low-cost. Because of this, the quantity of less useful information has increased considerably and consequently quality of information has improved/disseminated. Due to this problem, work to devise information filtering to obtain the information required for each specific topic easily and efficiently began.

== Operation ==
A filtering system of this style consists of several tools that help people find the most valuable information, so the limited time you can dedicate to read / listen / view, is correctly directed to the most interesting and valuable documents. These filters are also used to organize and structure information in a correct and understandable way, in addition to group messages on the mail addressed. These filters are essential in the results obtained of the search engines on the Internet. The functions of filtering improves every day to get downloading Web documents and more efficient messages.

=== Criterion ===
One of the criteria used in this step is whether the knowledge is harmful or not, whether knowledge allows a better understanding with or without the concept. In this case the task of information filtering to reduce or eliminate the harmful information with knowledge.

=== Learning System ===
A system of learning content consists, in general rules, mainly of three basic stages:

1. First, a system that provides solutions to a defined set of tasks.
2. Subsequently, it undergoes assessment criteria which will measure the performance of the previous stage in relation to solutions of problems.
3. Acquisition module which its output obtained knowledge that are used in the system solver of the first stage.

== Future ==
Currently the problem is not finding the best way to filter information, but the way that these systems require to learn independently the information needs of users. Not only because they automate the process of filtering but also the construction and adaptation of the filter. Some branches based on it, such as statistics, machine learning, pattern recognition and data mining, are the base for developing information filters that appear and adapt in base to experience. To carry out the learning process, part of the information has to be pre-filtered, which means there are positive and negative examples which we named training data, which can be generated by experts, or via feedback from ordinary users.

=== Error ===
As data is entered, the system includes new rules; if we consider that this data can generalize the training data information, then we have to evaluate the system development and measure the system's ability to correctly predict the categories of new information. This step is simplified by separating the training data in a new series called "test data" that we will use to measure the error rate. As a general rule it is important to distinguish between types of errors (false positives and false negatives). For example, in the case on an aggregator of content for children, it doesn't have the same seriousness to allow the passage of information not suitable for them, that shows violence or pornography, than the mistake to discard some appropriated information. To improve the system to lower error rates and have these systems with learning capabilities similar to humans we require development of systems that simulate human cognitive abilities, such as natural-language understanding, capturing meaning Common and other forms of advanced processing to achieve the semantics of information.

== Fields of use ==
Nowadays, there are numerous techniques to develop information filters, some of these reach error rates lower than 10% in various experiments. Among these techniques there are decision trees, support vector machines, neural networks, Bayesian networks, linear discriminants, logistic regression, etc.. At present, these techniques are used in different applications, not only in the web context, but in thematic issues as varied as voice recognition, classification of telescopic astronomy or evaluation of financial risk.

== See also ==
- Algorithmic curation – Curation of media using computer algorithms
- Artificial intelligence – Intelligence of machines
- Collaborative intelligence
- Filter bubble – Intellectual isolation through internet algorithms
- Information explosion – Rapid increase in the amount of published information or data
- Information literacy – Academic discipline
- Information overload – Decision making with too much information
- Information society – Society driven by the processing and communication of information
- Kalman filter – Algorithm that estimates unknowns from a series of measurements over time
- Reputation management – Influencing, controlling, enhancing, or concealing of an individual's or group's reputation
