= Melanie Calvert =

British epidemiologist and academic

Melanie Jane Calvert
- Education: University of Birmingham
- Scientific career
- Workplaces: University of Birmingham
- Thesis: The interactions of cardiac and skeletal troponin I and troponin C (2000)

Melanie Jane Calvert is a British epidemiologist who is professor of Outcomes Methodology at the University of Birmingham. Her research considers the design of clinical trials. She is Director of the Centre for Patient-reported outcomes Research, which looks to enhance patient care through optimised use of PROs in clinical trials. She was elected Fellow of the Academy of Medical Sciences in 2025.

== Early life and education ==
Calvert studied biochemistry at the University of Birmingham. She remained in Birmingham for her graduate studies, where she was supported by a Wellcome Trust prize to study the interactions of cardiac and skeletal troponins.

== Research and career ==
In 2024, Calvert was awarded an National Institute for Health and Care Research senior investigator award. Her research looks to improve patient-reported outcomes (PROs), and advocates for patient concerns to inform regulatory decision making. She is Director of the Centre for PROs Research, which looks to improve patient outcomes and centre patient perspectives at the heart of health research. She established a UK-wide network that looked to regulate and understand public perspectives of advanced therapies. For example, the network supports companies to develop, trial and launch cell and gene therapies. Calvert worked with George Freeman on the Taskforce on Innovation, Growth and Regulatory Reform (TIGRR) Report, which considered the regulation of medical devices. Calvert studied long COVID, analysing the financial impact, evaluating how people of different ethnicities suffered from the condition, and developing strategies (including a questionnaire) to measure the outcomes of long COVID therapies.

Calvert was elected a Fellow of the Academy of Medical Sciences (United Kingdom) in 2025.

== Selected publications ==
- Nick Freemantle; Melanie Calvert; John Wood; Joanne Eastaugh; Carl Griffin (1 May 2003). "Composite outcomes in randomized trials: greater precision but with greater uncertainty?". JAMA. 289 (19): 2554–2559. doi:10.1001/jama.289.19.2554. ISSN 0098-7484. PMID 12759327. Wikidata Q35132213.
- Melanie Calvert; Jane Blazeby; Douglas G Altman; Dennis A Revicki; David Moher; Michael D Brundage; CONSORT PRO Group (1 February 2013). "Reporting of patient-reported outcomes in randomized trials: the CONSORT PRO extension". JAMA. 309 (8): 814–822. doi:10.1001/jama.2013.879. ISSN 0098-7484. PMID 23443445. Wikidata Q38084855.
- Xiaoxuan Liu; Samantha Cruz Rivera; David Moher; Melanie Calvert; Alastair K. Denniston; SPIRIT-AI and CONSORT-AI Working Group (9 September 2020). "Reporting guidelines for clinical trial reports for interventions involving artificial intelligence: the CONSORT-AI extension". Nature medicine. 26 (9): 1364–1374. doi:10.1038/s41591-020-1034-x. ISSN 1078-8956. PMID 32908283. Wikidata Q99248625.
