= Metascience (disambiguation) =

Metascience is the use of scientific methodology to study science itself.

Metascience may also refer to:

- Meta-science, an obsolete term for the Philosophy of science
- Metascience (journal), a review journal of the history and philosophy of science and science and technology studies
- Meta-analysis, statistical analysis of the results of multiple scientific studies

== See also ==
- List of metascience research centers
- Science and technology studies
- Science of science policy
- Metaphysics
- Metageography
