= Strobe (disambiguation) =

Strobe, usually refers to a strobe light, in which light is emitted at regular intervals, usually as short flashes in rapid succession.

Strobe or STROBE may also refer to:

- Strobe effect, the apparently slowed down or reversal of periodic processes that are only observed at certain, regularly successive time intervals, for example by means of light flashes (stroboscopes) or a rotating disk with windows that only temporarily reveal the view.
- Flash (photography), in professional studio equipment, flashes may be large, standalone units, known as studio strobes.
- Strobe (comics), a character in the Marvel comics universe
- The Strobe, former name of Studio 54 Radio
- Strengthening the reporting of observational studies in epidemiology (STROBE)
- "Strobe" (instrumental), a 2009 instrumental by deadmau5 from For Lack of a Better Name
- Strobe Media Playback (SMP), a media player by Adobe Systems based on their Open Source Media Framework (OSMF)
- Strobe Talbott (born 1946), American foreign policy analyst and former US Deputy Secretary of State
- Strobe tuner, used to tune musical instruments and audio devices
- strobe.c, a TCP half-open portscanner written by Julian Assange in 1995

== See also ==
- Strob fungicide
