= Gordon Lee Paul =

American clinical psychologist (1935–2014)

Gordon Lee Paul (September 2, 1935 – April 15, 2014) was an American clinical psychologist, researcher, and university professor instrumental in the development of evidence-based psychotherapy research. He published more than 200 scientific papers and research monographs and formulated the clinical research question, "What treatment, by whom, is most effective for this individual, with that specific problem, under which set of circumstances, and how does it come about?" to guide research on psychotherapy effectiveness. Paul was the recipient of various awards including the Distinguished Scientist Award from Section 3 of Division 12 of the American Psychological Association, the Distinguished Scientific Contribution to Clinical Psychology from the American Psychological Association, and the Trailblazer Award for Lifetime Achievement from the Association for Behavioral and Cognitive Therapy as well as listing on Good Housekeeping's "Best Mental Health Experts" He held an academic appointment at the University of Illinois at Urbana-Champaign from 1965 to 1980 and was appointed to the Hugh Roy and Lillie Cranz Cullen Distinguished University Chaired Professorship at the University of Houston in 1980; a position he held until his retirement in 2011.

== Early life and education ==
Paul was born in Marshalltown, Iowa, on September 5, 1935, and was the only surviving child of Leon D. Paul and Ione Hickman (Perry) and grew up in a large extended family of cousins, aunts, uncles, and maternal grandparents. Living with such an extended family, he was surrounded by relatives that had behavioral and emotional problems. This began to plant seeds that would later lead to a career in psychology, however, his first career was in music. His initial career plans were to be a professional musician but as he wrote in his intellectual autobiography, numerous life events led to a change in focus to psychopathology. After Navy service as a musician he finished his undergraduate degree in psychology and mathematics at the University of Iowa in 1960. He then enrolled in the clinical psychology graduate program at the University of Illinois at Urbana-Champaign earning M.A. (1962) and Ph.D. (1964) degrees under the direction of Charles W. Eriksen. Paul then completed a Postdoctoral Psychology Internship/Residency at the Veterans Administration Medical Center & Stanford University in Palo Alto, CA.

== Research on anxiety and psychotherapy ==
In 1965 Paul joined the faculty of the Department of psychology at the University of Illinois at Urbana-Champaign. His early conceptual approach to psychopathology and psychotherapy was ego-analytic but his early research on unconscious learning began a conceptual shift. His doctoral dissertation, a randomized clinical trial of two treatment approaches to performance anxiety continued this conceptual shift and he later adapted a broad-based social-learning empirical framework. Over the next several years Paul published a series of methodological papers, several of which became Citation Classics, on the study of psychotherapy and provided prescriptive guidelines for evidence-based research to evaluate the effectiveness of various therapeutic interventions.

== Research on treatment of institutionalized mental patients ==
Paul's research focus then shifted from anxiety-related disorders to serious mental illness and the treatment of institutionalized chronic mental patients. In 1968 Paul began a 5-year long comparative outcome study of unit-wide treatment programs for chronic mental patients. The results of this long-term randomized clinical trial, co-authored with Robert J. Lentz, provided strong support for a broad-based social-learning treatment program along with a comprehensive and integrated assessment system as the treatment of choice for severely disabled institutionalized patients.

== Research and development of comprehensive assessment systems ==
Paul was appointed as a Distinguished Professor at the University of Houston in 1980 where he continued his research on the seriously mentally ill. He, along with colleagues Marco J. Mariotto, Mark H. Licht, Christopher T. Power and Kathryn L. Engel, undertook a series of multi-institutional psychometric validation studies of the comprehensive assessment systems developed for the chronic mental patients in the earlier comparative outcome study. This research led to the publication of three monographs providing empirical support for the comprehensive assessment systems as well as a conceptual re-examination of how assessment should be utilized to aid decision-making in adult inpatient and residential treatment settings.
