= IDEAL framework =

IDEAL (Idea, Development, Exploration, Assessment, Long-term study) is a framework for describing the stages of innovation in surgery and other interventional procedures. The purpose of IDEAL is to improve the quality of research in surgery by emphasizing appropriate methods, transparency of data and rigorous reporting of outcomes.

To achieve this, the IDEAL framework provides a set of recommendations for improving the evidence base from research at each stage of innovation, as outlined in the seminal paper published in The Lancet in 2009. The recommendations emphasize evaluating new procedures prospectively, entering patients and studies into registries and databases to capture all incidences of a procedure, and reporting outcomes by established protocols. It is the first and only such framework for evidence-based practice that was established specifically for surgery and interventional procedures.

== Background ==
The IDEAL framework was the result of an expert consensus developed from a series of meetings held at Balliol College, Oxford, from 2007 to 2009. This group was known as the Balliol Collaboration. The purpose of the meetings was to address the challenges unique to establishing the optimal evidence base in surgery, including practical, methodological, and ethical challenges. Attendees to the meeting (the “IDEAL collaboration”) included experts in evidence-based medicine, including Cochrane Collaboration founder Iain Chalmers, public health expert Muir Gray, statistician and founder of the Centre for Statistics in Medicine in Oxford Doug Altman, clinician-researchers, methodologists, and manufacturers of medical devices.

== Framework and recommendations ==
The five stages of IDEAL, and the recommendations for each stage, are as follows:

=== Stage 1: Idea ===
- All new procedures should be reported automatically
- An online registry should be established for reporting of procedures
- Reports should include adverse events

=== Stage 2a: Development ===
- Protocols for prospective development studies should be established
- Protocols should include details about patient selection, operative methods and predefined outcomes
- A registry for these protocols should be established
- The publication of retrospective case series should be avoided
- If retrospective case series are to be published, they should include all consecutive patients and adhere to a reporting template such as STROBE

=== Stage 2b: Exploration ===
- A prospective research database should be established
- Validated methods for evaluating learning curves, such as CUSUM, should be used
- Reporting should be more disease-based than procedure-based
- Outcome measures should be predefined and include technical, clinical, and patient-reported outcomes

=== Stage 3: Assessment ===
- Study design should be a randomized controlled trial, or acceptable alternatives

=== Stage 4: Long-term study ===
- Reporting should include only key outcomes and relevant information
- When comparing outcomes among different surgeons or interventionalists and institutions, results should be adjusted for the comorbidities of the patient and the learning curve of the surgeon or interventionalist

== Proposals ==
In the original publication in The Lancet, the authors outline a number of proposals for key stakeholders in the generation of surgical evidence. These include journal editors, funders of services and research, regulators, and professional societies.

== IDEAL collaboration ==
The original IDEAL collaboration consists of attendees to the Balliol meetings. Subsequent members include other stakeholders in evidence-based surgery and interventional procedures. The IDEAL collaboration is led by Oxford surgeon-researcher Peter McCulloch.

== Role in device regulation ==
While the initial Balliol meetings were intended to address innovations in surgery and interventional procedures, it soon became clear that there were also deficits in the evaluation of medical devices and implants used in such procedures. In December 2011, the Center for Devices and Radiological Health of the United States Food and Drug Administration held a public workshop on using the IDEAL framework to help develop high-quality evidence for devices and implants. In September 2012, the FDA published its strategy for improved postmarket surveillance based in part on the discussions from the IDEAL meeting, including the promotion of registries for devices, better assessment of evidence already published, and improved reporting of adverse events. IDEAL collaborators have written several editorials and commentaries in journals such as the British Medical Journal and The Lancet concerning the regulation of devices.
