= David Moher =

Irish epidemiologist (born 1957)

- Born: April 17, 1957 (age 68); Dublin, Ireland
- Education: St Mary's College, Dublin; Queen's University; University of Amsterdam
- Known for: Research on systematic reviews
- Awards: J. David Grimes Career Achievement Award from the Ottawa Hospital Research Institute (2015)
- Scientific career
- Fields: Epidemiology; Journalology
- Institutions: Ottawa Hospital Research Institute; University of Ottawa
- Thesis: Invasive cervical carcinoma in younger women (1986)

David Moher (born April 17, 1957) is an Irish epidemiologist and senior scientist in the Clinical Epidemiology Program at the Ottawa Hospital Research Institute (OHRI), where he is also Director of the Centre for Journalology, and the Canadian EQUATOR Centre. He is also a professor and University Research Chair at the University of Ottawa. An expert on systematic reviews in medical science, he played a major role in the development of both the PRISMA and CONSORT statements. He is a co-editor-in-chief of the peer-reviewed journal Systematic Reviews. He has been recognised as an ISI Highly Cited Researcher, and received the Grimes Research Career Achievement Award from OHRI in 2015.

== Biography ==
Moher grew up in Dublin, Ireland, where he had undiagnosed dyslexia while in elementary school. This prevented him from learning to read and write until he was thirteen. He received his BSW from St Mary's College, Dublin in 1980, his B.A. in psychology from Queen's University in 1983, and his M.Sc. from Queen's University in 1986. In 2004, he received his Ph.D. in clinical epidemiology and biostatistics from the University of Amsterdam. He became an associate professor in the Department of Epidemiology and Community Medicine at the University of Ottawa in 2004, and was named a University Research Chair there in 2006. He has been a senior scientist in the Knowledge Synthesis Group at the Ottawa Hospital Research Institute since 2008, and the co-editor-in-chief of Systematic Reviews since 2011.

== See also ==
- Doug Altman
- Julian Higgins
- John Ioannidis
- George Davey Smith
