= EQUATOR Network =

International health-research-quality initiative

The EQUATOR Network
- Website: www.equator-network.org
- Commercial: No
- Launched: 2008
- Current status: Active

The Enhancing the Quality and Transparency of health research Network (EQUATOR Network) is an international initiative aimed at promoting transparent and accurate reporting of health research studies to enhance the value and reliability of medical research literature. The EQUATOR Network was established with the goals of raising awareness of the importance of good reporting of research, assisting in the development, dissemination and implementation of reporting guidelines for different types of study designs, monitoring the status of the quality of reporting of research studies in the health sciences literature, and conducting research relating to issues that impact the quality of reporting of health research studies. The Network acts as an "umbrella" organisation, bringing together developers of reporting guidelines, medical journal editors and peer reviewers, research funding bodies, and other key stakeholders with a mutual interest in improving the quality of research publications and research itself. The EQUATOR Network comprises five centres at the University of Birmingham (UK, Professor Gary Collins), Bond University (Australia, Professor Paul Glasziou and Professor Tammy Hoffman), Paris Descartes University (France, Professor Philippe Ravaud), Ottawa Hospital Research Institute (Canada, Professor David Moher), and Hong Kong Baptist University (China, Professor Zhaoxiang Bian).

== History ==
The EQUATOR Network grew out as part of spin-off projects generated after the work initiated by the Consolidated Standards of Reporting Trials group and other guideline development groups to alleviate the problems arising from inadequate reporting of randomized controlled trials and other types of health research studies. The EQUATOR project began in March 2006 as part of a one-year project funded by the UK National Knowledge Science, from the National Health Service (NHS). The group founded by Douglas Altman whilst at the University of Oxford planned a program that would develop online resources and training to encourage the use of reporting guidelines in scientific publishing in the health area to improve the quality of reporting of health research studies, identifying key stakeholders engaged in these activities and networking with them.

The first international working meeting of the EQUATOR Network took place in Oxford in 2006 and was attended by 27 participants from 10 countries. Participants at this meeting were reporting guidelines developers, journal editors, peer reviewers, medical writers and research funders. The meeting served as a venue to exchange experiences among participants in developing, using and implementing reporting guidelines and prioritize the main activities that were necessary for the successful start of the EQUATOR Network's efforts.

The EQUATOR Network was formally launched on 26 June 2008 at the Royal Society of Medicine in London, UK. The event also hosted the 1st EQUATOR Annual Lecture presented by Sir Iain Chalmers. In that meeting, the results of a study by Iveta Simera, Douglas Altman, David Moher, Kenneth Schulz and John Hoey, were presented, and published two years later. The study identified the need for a coordinated work between publishers, researchers and funders to improve the quality of the research output.

Since then, the EQUATOR Network has held annual lectures that have been held in Vancouver (Canada) in 2009, Oxford (UK) in 2010, Bristol (UK) in 2011, and Freiburg (Germany) in 2012.

== The EQUATOR Network Library ==
The EQUATOR Network developed and maintains a comprehensive library that provides a collection of publications related to reporting guidelines on scientific writing, empirical evidence supporting or refuting the inclusion of crucial items in reporting guidelines, evaluations of the quality of reporting, publication ethics and educational materials and tools for editors, peer reviewers and researchers. Comprehensive lists of reporting guidelines for the following study types are available in the EQUATOR Network library:

- Randomized trials (SPIRIT, CONSORT)
- Observational studies (STROBE)
- Case reports (CARE)
- Diagnostic accuracy studies (STARD)
- Clinical prediction model studies (TRIPOD)
- Systematic reviews (PRISMA, PRISMA-P, TRIPOD-SRMA)
- Qualitative research (SRQR, COREQ)
- Animal studies (ARRIVE)
- Global burden of disease (GATHER)
- Economic evaluations (CHEERS)
- Quality improvement studies (SQUIRE)
- Genetic association studies (STREGA)
- Artificial Intelligence studies (TRIPOD+AI, CONSORT-AI, DECIDE-AI)

Additional guidelines are available for practical issues relevant to the reporting of health research:

- Reporting data
- Statistical methods and analyses
- Guidance on scientific writing
- Research ethics, publication ethics and good practice guidelines

== See also ==
- Metascience
- Science policy
- Science of science policy
