= OSMF =

OSMF is an initialism that may refer to:

- Old Settler's Music Festival, an annual music festival in Texas
- Open Source Media Framework, a software framework for Web and desktop applications
- OpenStreetMap Foundation, a nonprofit foundation that promotes open geospatial data
- Oral submucous fibrosis, a medical condition
