= Ottawa Hospital Research Institute =

Research institute of The Ottawa Hospital, Canada

Coordinates: 45.39307°N 75.72391°W

The Ottawa Hospital Research Institute (OHRI), formerly Ottawa Health Research Institute, is a non-profit academic health research institute located in the city of Ottawa. It was formed in 2001 following the merger of three Ottawa hospitals. The Ottawa Hospital Research Institute is the research arm of The Ottawa Hospital and affiliated with the University of Ottawa.

As of 2022, the Ottawa Hospital Research Institute houses approximately 2,200 scientists, clinician investigators, students, research fellows, and support staff. It has five research programs: Cancer Therapeutics; Chronic Disease; Clinical Epidemiology; Regenerative Medicine; and Neurosciences. Its researchers are studying more than a hundred different diseases, conditions and specialties with an overall focus on translating discoveries and knowledge into better health.

Ronald G. Worton was the research institute's founding CEO and Scientific Director in 2001. In 2007, Duncan Stewart, formerly Chief Cardiologist of St. Michael's Hospital in Toronto and Director of Cardiology of University of Toronto, took over as CEO and Scientific Director.

== History ==
=== COVID-19 ===
During the COVID-19 pandemic, scientists at the OHRI developed an early-stage COVID-19 vaccine candidate called TOH-Vac1. The candidate is a live replicating virus vaccine using a vaccinia virus vector. Results from pre-clinical studies were published in Molecular Therapy in October 2021. The research team was led by John Bell and was funded by the Thistledown Foundation, Ottawa Hospital Foundation and the Canadian Institutes of Health Research.

== Notable discoveries and accomplishments ==
- Harold Atkins and Mark Freedman pioneered the use of autologous hematopoietic stem cell transplantation for the treatment of multiple sclerosis.
- Michael Rudnicki was the first to characterize adult skeletal muscle stem cells.
- Ian Stiell developed the Ottawa ankle rules.
- David Moher led the development of the CONSORT reporting guidelines for clinical trials and the PRISMA reporting guidelines for systematic reviews and meta-analyses.
- Doug Manuel developed ProjectBigLife, a life expectancy calculator that helps educate people about healthy lifestyle choices.
- John Bell and his colleagues demonstrated for the first time that an intravenously-delivered viral therapy can selectively infect and spread within tumours in humans.
- Dean Fergusson and Paul Hebert discovered that aprotinin is associated with an increased risk of death compared to other drugs routinely used to prevent blood loss during heart surgery.
- Annette O'Connor pioneered the use of Patient Decision Aids.
- Natasha Kekre is leading the first clinical trial of made-in-Canada CAR-T cells for the treatment of cancer.

== Notable faculty and alumni ==
- John Cameron Bell
- Dean Fergusson
- Ian Graham
- Jeremy Grimshaw
- Michael McBurney
- David Moher
- Annette O'Connor
- Michael Rudnicki
