= Jonathan Sterne =

British statistician and NIHR Senior Investigator

Jonathan A.C. Sterne
- Education: University of Oxford, University College of London
- Known for: Causal inference, Meta-analysis
- Scientific career
- Fields: Medical statistics
- Workplaces: University of Bristol

Jonathan A.C. Sterne is a British statistician, NIHR Senior Investigator, Professor of Medical Statistics and Epidemiology, and the former Head of School of Social and Community Medicine at the University of Bristol. He is co-author of “Essential Medical Statistics”, which received Highly Commended honors in the 2004 BMA Medical Book Competition.

== Work ==
Sterne has been identified by Clarivate Analytics as a "Highly Cited Researcher" in the last three years, based on multiple highly cited papers that rank in the top 1% by citations for field and year in Web of Science.

His research interests include methodology for systematic reviews and meta-analyses, clinical epidemiology of HIV and AIDS in the era of antiretroviral therapy, causal inference, methodology for epidemiology and health services research, and epidemiology of asthma and allergic diseases.

Sterne has led the development of the ROBINS-I tool for assessing risk of bias in non-randomized studies of interventions and the Cochrane Risk of Bias (RoB) tool for randomized trials. He also leads a large collaboration of HIV cohort studies, which has advanced understanding of prognosis in HIV positive people. He also authored a number of meta-analysis software routines used by students and researchers worldwide.

On 28 August 2019 Sterne, along with Julian Higgins and colleagues, published in The RoB 2 tool in the British Medical Journal, an updated version of the leading tool for assessing risk of bias in randomized trials included in systematic reviews.

Sterne was elected a Fellow of the Academy of Medical Sciences in 2021.

== Education ==
Sterne completed his undergraduate studies in mathematics at the University of Oxford. He holds an MSc and PhD in statistics from the University College London.
