= Muir Gray =

British physician

Sir J.A. Muir Gray CBE FRCPSGlas FCLIP
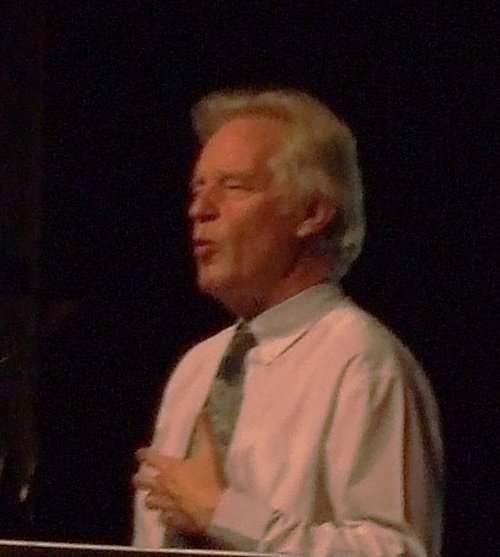
- Gray in 2007
- Born: Scotland
- Known for: UK National Screening Programme, National Library for Health
- Scientific career
- Workplaces: Oxford University, NHS

Sir John Armstrong Muir Gray CBE FRCPSGlas FCLIP is a British physician, who has held senior positions in screening, public health, information management. and value in healthcare. He was the Chief Knowledge Officer for EXI, a digital health therapeutic company prescribing exercise to people with or at risk of up to 23 long-term health conditions, and is Chief Wellbeing Officer for Learning with Experts, a health related online learning company working with the NHS.

He was director of Research and Development for Anglia and Oxford Regional Health Authority and supported the United Kingdom Centre of the Cochrane Collaboration in promoting evidence-based medicine. He held the positions of director at the UK National Screening Committee, during which he helped pioneer Britain's breast and cervical cancer screening programmes, and National Library for Health, and director of Clinical Knowledge Process and Safety for the NHS National Programme for IT.

He was knighted in 2005 for the development of the foetal, maternal and child screening programme and the creation of the National Library for Health.

He was the director of the National Knowledge Service and Chief Knowledge Officer to the National Health Service, a Director of the healthcare rating and review service iWantGreatCare and helped found the Centre for Sustainable Healthcare.

In 2006 he developed the NHS's framework for value (triple value). He was then the founding Director of the NHS Rightcare programme, trying to change the culture of the NHS to become a higher value organisation. He published many influential Atlases of Variation. He then left to found Better Value Healthcare, and then the Oxford Centre for Triple Value Healthcare, a mission driven social enterprise.

He is also one of the original authors of the IDEAL framework for surgical innovation.

== Selected books ==
- Gray, Muir (2015). Sod 70!. Bloomsbury Press. ISBN 978-1472918970.
- Raffle, Angela E; J.A. Muir Gray (2007). Screening: Evidence and practice. OUP Oxford. ISBN 978-0-19-921449-5.
- Gray, J.A. Muir (2007). How to Get Better Value Healthcare. Offox Press. ISBN 978-1-904202-01-1.
- Gray, Muir (2001). The Resourceful Patient. eRosetta Press. ISBN 978-1-904202-00-4.
- Pencheon, David; Charles Guest; David Melzer; J. A. Muir Gray (2001). The Oxford Handbook of Public Health Practice. Oxford Handbooks. Oxford University Press. ISBN 978-0-19-263221-0.
- Gray, J.A. Muir (1996). Evidence-based Healthcare. Churchill Livingstone. ISBN 978-0-443-05721-2.
- Gray, J.A. Muir (1989). PM The PM System Preventive Medicine for Total Health Identify Your Symptoms and Prevent Illness. Arrow Books.
- Many, D.C.; J. A. Muir Gray (1987). Building Regulations and Health. IHS BRE. ISBN 978-0-85125-236-0.
- Muir Gray (2016). mid life. Penguin Random House.
