= George Davey Smith =

British epidemiologist

George Davey Smith FRS
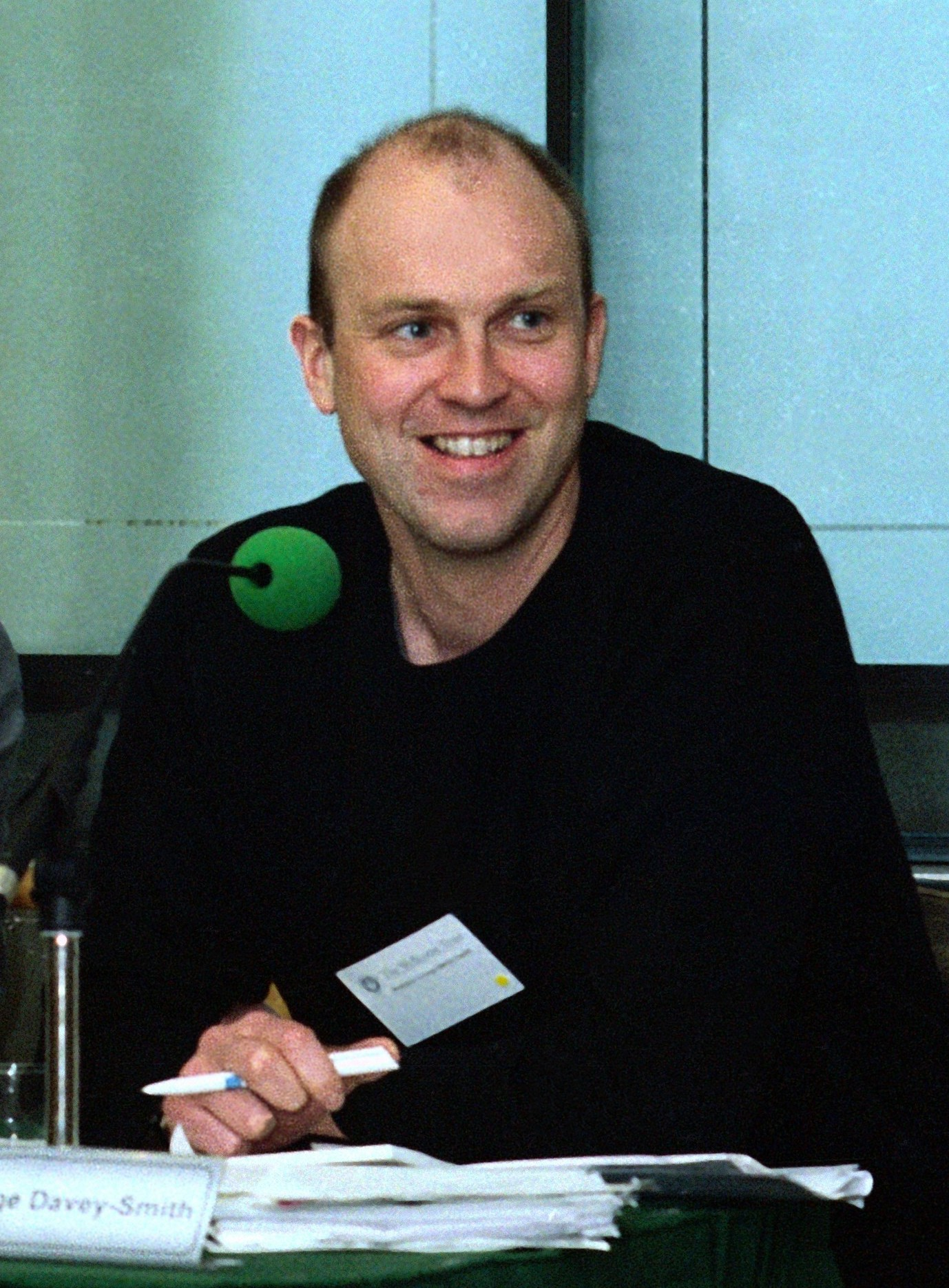
- Davey Smith in March 1999
- Born: 9 May 1959 (age 67)
- Citizenship: British
- Education: Queen's College, Oxford (BA 1981; DSc 2000); Jesus College, Cambridge (MB BChir 1984; MD 1991); London School of Hygiene & Tropical Medicine (MSc 1988)
- Known for: Health inequalities; Life course approach to epidemiology; Mendelian randomization
- Scientific career
- Fields: Epidemiology
- Institutions: Welsh Heart Programme, Cardiff (1985–86); University College & Middlesex School of Medicine (1986–89); London School of Hygiene & Tropical Medicine (1989–92); University of Glasgow (1992–94); University of Bristol (1994–)
- Thesis: Physical fitness and risk factors for coronary heart disease (1991)

George Davey Smith FRS (born 9 May 1959) is a British epidemiologist. He has been professor of clinical epidemiology at the University of Bristol since 1994, honorary professor of public health at the University of Glasgow since 1996, and visiting professor at the London School of Hygiene and Tropical Medicine since 1999.

He was also the scientific director of the Avon Longitudinal Study of Parents and Children (until replaced in 2017 by Nic Timpson) and a former editor-in-chief of the International Journal of Epidemiology.

== Education ==
Davey Smith attended Stockton Heath Primary School and Lymm Grammar School in Warrington in North West England. He received a BA from Queen's College, Oxford in 1981, an MB BChir from Jesus College, Cambridge in 1984, an MSc from the London School of Hygiene and Tropical Medicine in 1988, an MD from Jesus College, Cambridge in 1991, and a DSc from Queen's College, Oxford in 2000.

== Honours and awards ==
Davey Smith is an ISI highly cited researcher, a fellow of the Royal Society of Edinburgh, and a fellow of the Academy of Medical Sciences, United Kingdom. In 2019 Davey Smith became foreign member of the Royal Netherlands Academy of Arts and Sciences.

== See also ==
- Doug Altman
- Julian Higgins
- John Ioannidis
- David Moher
