= Centre for Statistics in Medicine =

- Headquarters: University of Oxford
- Founder: Professor Douglas Altman
- Website: https://www.ndorms.ox.ac.uk/csm
- Current status: Active

The Centre for Statistics in Medicine (CSM) at the University of Oxford, United Kingdom was founded by Professor Douglas G. Altman who headed it until 2018. He was succeeded by Professor Sallie Lamb until 2019, then by Professor Gary Collins until 2025. In 1995 it was based at the Institute of Health Sciences in Headington, Oxford, it relocated to the annexe of Wolfson College, Oxford in 2005, and in 2013 moved to the Botnar Research Centre in Headington.

The CSM incorporates the Cancer Research UK Medical Statistics Group (MSG), Oxford Clinical Trial Research Unit statisticians and the UK EQUATOR Centre. It is based in the Nuffield Department of Orthopaedics, Rheumatology & Musculoskeletal Sciences in the University of Oxford.

CSM collaborates in health care research, conducts applied statistical research and runs training courses/workshops for both health care workers and statisticians.

Statisticians within the CSM are involved in many collaborative projects with clinicians in Oxford and further afield, some working across the medical spectrum and others focusing on cancer. Other statisticians within the CSM work primarily on a programme of methodological research, in particular relating to studies of diagnosis and prognosis, and to systematic reviews and meta-analysis.
