= Research Integrity and Peer Review =

- Language: English

Publication details
- History: 2016–present
- Publisher: BioMed Central

Standard abbreviations
- ISO 4: Res. Integr. Peer Rev.

Indexing
- ISSN: 2058-8615
- OCLC no.: 951554957

Links
- Journal homepage

Research Integrity and Peer Review is an international, open access, peer reviewed journal that was launched in 2016. It is published by BioMed Central and focuses on problems in peer review, replication, and the scientific process.

== See also ==
- Metascience
