= Julian Higgins =

Statistician

- Born: Julian Piers Thomas Higgins; 1971 (age 54–55); Middlesbrough
- Education: Durham University; University of Cambridge; University of Reading
- Scientific career
- Fields: Biostatistics
- Workplaces: Imperial College London; University College London; University of York; Medical Research Council; University of Bristol
- Thesis: Exploiting information in random effects meta-analysis (1997)

Julian Piers Thomas Higgins (born 1971) is a British biostatistician. He is Professor of Evidence Synthesis and Director of Research at the Department of Population Health Sciences at the University of Bristol.

Higgins was previously Chair in Evidence Synthesis at the University of York, and Programme Leader at the MRC Biostatistics Unit in Cambridge. He was President of the Society for Research Synthesis Methodology from 2005 to 2006.

== Early life and education ==
Higgins was born in North Yorkshire, where he attended the Stokesley School. He completed his undergraduate studies in mathematics at Durham University in 1992, earned a diploma in mathematical statistics from the University of Cambridge in 1993, and obtained a PhD in applied statistics from the University of Reading in 1997.

== Academic career ==
Higgins is a Senior Investigator at the National Institute for Health Research (NIHR). An expert on meta-analysis and systematic review methodologies, Professor Higgins contributes actively to the Cochrane Collaboration, where he also serves as Senior Methods Advisor. He is a co-editor of the Cochrane Handbook for Systematic Reviews of Interventions and has been named an ISI Highly Cited researcher each year since 2015.

On 28 August 2019 Higgins, along with Jonathan Sterne, Jelena Savović, and colleagues, published in the British Medical Journal an article detailing "RoB 2", a revised tool for assessing risk of bias in randomized trials. Assessing risk of bias is regarded as an essential component of a systematic review. The most commonly used tool for assessing risk of bias to date has been the Cochrane risk-of-bias tool, which Professor Higgins introduced in 2008.

== See also ==
- Doug Altman
- John Ioannidis
- David Moher
- George Davey Smith
