= John Cameron Bell =

Canadian cancer researcher

John Cameron Bell OC (born July 10, 1953, in Ancaster, Ontario) is a senior cancer researcher at the Ottawa Hospital Research Institute (OHRI). He currently resides in Ottawa, Ontario with his wife Sheila.

John and Sheila Bell at the 2010 OHRI Gala.

== Education ==
John received his bachelor's degree and Ph.D. from McMaster University in Hamilton, Ontario in 1982. He also held Postdoctoral positions at the University of Ottawa with Dr. Michael McBurney, and at the National Institute for Medical Research in London, England with Dr. Gordon Foulkes. Following this, he was a professor of biochemistry at McGill University from 1985 to 1988, and is presently a professor of medicine at the University of Ottawa

== Work and research ==
Bell is the co-founder and chief scientific officer of Jennerex, Inc., which is a biotech company in San Francisco that is producing oncolytic viruses as a new therapeutic technique to treat cancers. Early trials of this technique have been shown to be very effective in eliminating tumours, most notably so far OncoVEX GM-CSF (BioVex Inc, Woburn, MA) which is in Phase 3 clinical trials for melanoma. These viruses are thought to even provide immunity against certain types of cancer. It is hoped that these therapies will become a viable, and even more successful alternative to treatments such as chemotherapy, which are extremely physically demanding for patients.

He is the recipient of one of the largest grants ever awarded by the Terry Fox Foundation, has received numerous awards, and was even named Canada's third most influential person in a Maclean's online reader's poll in 2003.

Bell is the founder of the Canadian Oncolytic Virus Consortium, the first of its kind in the world, and it aims to expand cancer viral therapy discovery and application at all levels.

He won the 2010 Dr. J. David Grimes Award from the Ottawa Hospital Research Institute for career contributions to science.

In 2011, viral treatments developed by Bell's lab gained international notoriety following a publication in the journal Nature. The results presented in the article showed that the viruses were selectively targeting cancerous cells in humans following intravenous injection, and limited further tumour growth.

In June 2012, Bell received a medal at the Queen's Diamond Jubilee. In 2013, he was elected to the Royal Society of Canada.

In 2015, he was featured in the Vice documentary series, in an episode called VICE Special Report: Killing Cancer.

He was made an Officer of the Order of Canada on December 31, 2025.
