= Meta-Research Innovation Center at Stanford =

The Meta-Research Innovation Center at Stanford (METRICS) is a research center within the Stanford School of Medicine that aims to improve reproducibility by studying how science is practiced and published and developing better ways for the scientific community to operate. It is headed by John Ioannidis and Steven Goodman. Laura and John Arnold Foundation provided the initial founding of the center, which launched in 2014. Ioannidis' past work that led to the creation of METRICS has been covered twice in The New York Times.

== See also ==
- Cochrane Collaboration
- List of metascience research centers and organisations
- Meta-research
- Scientometrics
