= Meta-Research Center at Tilburg University =

Dutch metascience research center

Meta-Research Center
- Established: 2012; 14 years ago
- Parent institution: Tilburg University
- Location: Tilburg, Netherlands
- Website: metaresearch.nl

The Meta-Research Center at Tilburg University is a metascience research center within the School of Social and Behavioral Sciences at the Dutch Tilburg University. They were profiled in a September 2018 article in Science.

== Research ==
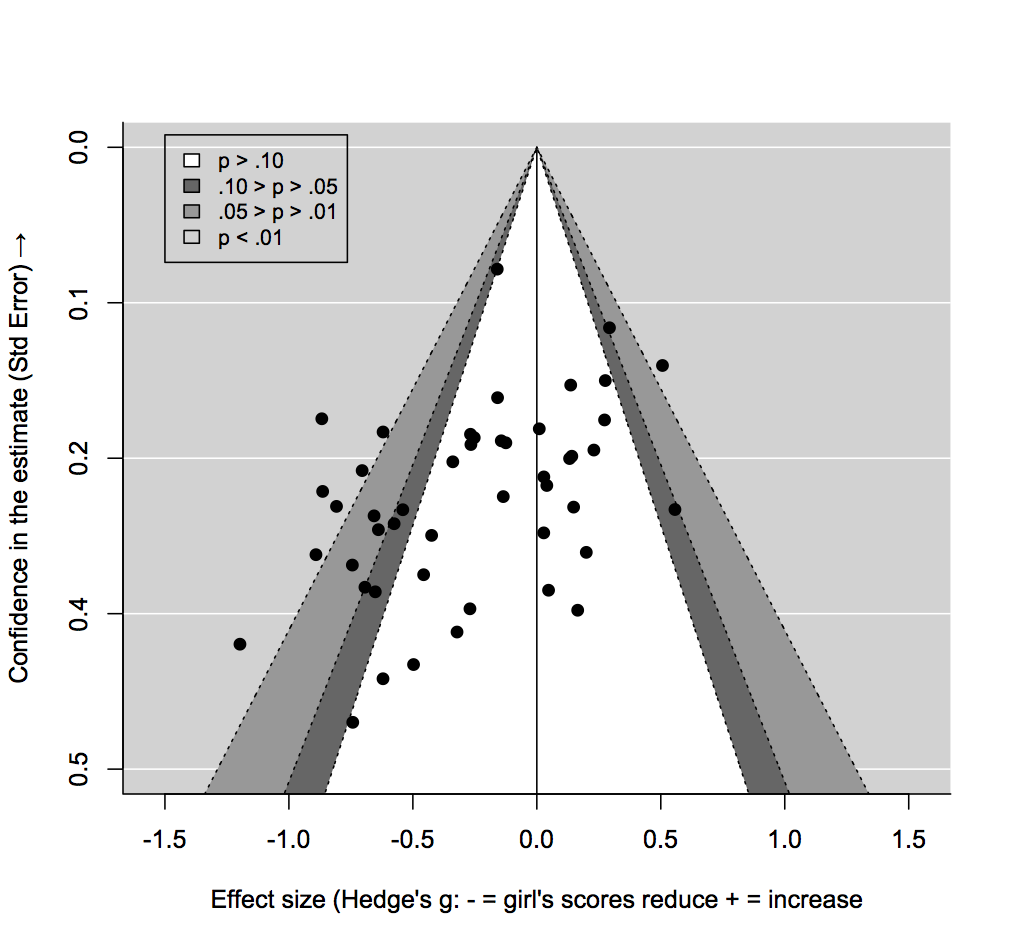
Meta-analysis of stereotype threat on girls showing asymmetry typical of publication bias. From Flore, P. C., & Wicherts, J. M. (2014)

Meta-research aims to improve reproducibility by studying how science is practiced and published and developing better ways for the scientific community to operate.

The research institute has published a large statistical meta-analysis of studies on the effect of Stereotype threat on girls' mathematics performance. They also use methods for estimating publication bias.

The research institute has developed an R based software tool called Statcheck that can detect incorrect statistical methods used in research articles. A large amount of statistical errors were detected in a sample of 50 000 psychology research articles. The use of it was perceived negatively by some of the researchers. The data mining practices of the research center have been in conflict with the policies of scientific publisher Elsevier.

A scientific misconduct case in the field of social psychology at Tilburg University has been a contributing factor in establishing the research center.

== Advocacy ==
The research center makes recommendations for other researchers about how to avoid publication bias and to improve the statistical strength of results. They have stated support for pre-registration of studies and open sharing of research data.

== See also ==
- Meta-research
- Scientometrics
- Addressing the replication crisis
- List of metascience research centers and organisations
