= Adobe Media Player =

Discontinued desktop media player

- Adobe Media Player 1.8 on Windows 7
- Developer: Adobe Systems
- Release: 16 April 2007; 19 years ago
- Final release: 1.8 / 17 May 2010; 16 years ago
- Operating system: Mac OS X and Microsoft Windows
- Platform: Adobe AIR
- Type: Media player, Internet television, Media Aggregator
- License: Freeware
- Website: www.adobe.com/products/mediaplayer/

Adobe Media Player was a desktop media player that allowed users to manage and interact with their media content, and allowed content publishers to define branding and advertising in and around their content. The Adobe Media Player was one of the first Adobe AIR applications from Adobe Systems. It was announced at NAB show in Las Vegas and was released in April 2008. It used DRM and enforces advertisement viewing, when watching videos both online and offline.

The player was designed to allow users to subscribe to webcasts from various providers to be either streamed or download for viewing offline. Adobe had signed CBS, PBS, MTV Networks, Universal Music Group, CondeNet, and Scripps Networks as partners. Adobe had planned to release other features to support various business models, such as the ability to rent videos.

Adobe Media Player was discontinued on 16 September 2010.

The player had been praised for its user-friendliness and compared to the internet TV service Joost.

== See also ==
- Open Source Media Framework (OSMF)
