= Scientific enterprise =

Scientific endeavor by an entrepreneur

A scientific enterprise is a science-based project developed by, or in cooperation with, a private entrepreneur. For example, in the Age of Exploration, leaders like Henry the Navigator founded schools of navigation, from which stemmed voyages of exploration.

== Examples of enterprising scientific organizations ==
Each organization listed below has the ability to conduct scientific research on an extended basis, involving multiple researchers over an extended time. Generally, the research is funded not only for the science itself, but for some application which shows promise for the enterprise. But the researchers, if left to their own choices, will tend to follow their research interest, which is essential for the long-term health of their chosen field. Note that a successful scientific enterprise is not equivalent to a successful high-tech enterprise or to a successful business enterprise, but that they form an ecology, a food chain.

- The Max Planck Institute, which supports fundamental research in the natural, life and social sciences, the arts and humanities
- The RAND Corporation, founded as a research corporation. Did groundbreaking work in the field of artificial intelligence
- The Jet Propulsion Laboratory, founded by Theodore von Kármán
- Bell Laboratories, renowned for the quality of its scientific work and for inventing the operating system Unix, and the programming languages C and C++
- Xerox PARC, research organization which has also spawned innovations such as the graphical user interface, laser printing, and Ethernet
- SRI, where the computer mouse was invented, were explicitly founded with a research basis
- IBM Research, notable for inventing the relational database, hard disk drive, and floppy disk
- Hughes Research Laboratories, location of the invention of the first working laser
- The Howard Hughes Medical Institute, non-profit medical research organization

== See also ==
- Science of science policy (SoSP)
