= Jane Blazeby =

Professor of surgical medicine

Jane Miranda Blazeby is a professor of surgery at the University of Bristol and in 2021 she was elected a fellow of the Academy of Medical Sciences. She is known for her work on the quality of life experienced by people following surgery.

== Education and career ==
Blazeby has a BSc (1985), an M.B. (1998), and an M.D. (1999) from the University of Bristol. Blazeby also holds an MSc in Epidemiology and Public Health from the University of London (2005). As of 2006, she is a professor of surgery at the University of Bristol

== Career ==
In 2000, Blazeby was awarded a Medical Research Council Clinician Scientist award to investigate principles and practices of outcome measures in surgical oncology. She is also known for her work on patient-reported outcomes and research into optional wound dressings following surgery.

== Selected publications ==
As of 2022 Blazeby has an h-index of 87 with over 28000 citations to her research.

- Williamson, Paula R; Altman, Douglas G; Blazeby, Jane M; Clarke, Mike; Devane, Declan; Gargon, Elizabeth; Tugwell, Peter (December 2012). "Developing core outcome sets for clinical trials: issues to consider". Trials. 13 (1): 132. doi:10.1186/1745-6215-13-132. PMC 3472231. PMID 22867278.
- Donovan, Jenny L.; Hamdy, Freddie C.; Lane, J. Athene; Mason, Malcolm; Metcalfe, Chris; Walsh, Eleanor; Blazeby, Jane M.; Peters, Tim J.; Holding, Peter; Bonnington, Susan; Lennon, Teresa; Bradshaw, Lynne; Cooper, Deborah; Herbert, Phillipa; Howson, Joanne; Jones, Amanda; Lyons, Norma; Salter, Elizabeth; Thompson, Pauline; Tidball, Sarah; Blaikie, Jan; Gray, Catherine; Bollina, Prasad; Catto, James; Doble, Andrew; Doherty, Alan; Gillatt, David; Kockelbergh, Roger; Kynaston, Howard; Paul, Alan; Powell, Philip; Prescott, Stephen; Rosario, Derek J.; Rowe, Edward; Davis, Michael; Turner, Emma L.; Martin, Richard M.; Neal, David E. (13 October 2016). "Patient-Reported Outcomes after Monitoring, Surgery, or Radiotherapy for Prostate Cancer". New England Journal of Medicine. 375 (15): 1425–1437. doi:10.1056/NEJMoa1606221. PMC 5134995. PMID 27626365.
- Blazeby, J. M.; Conroy, T.; Hammerlid, E.; Fayers, P.; Sezer, O.; Koller, M.; Arraras, J.; Bottomley, A.; Vickery, C. W.; Etienne, P. L.; Alderson, D. (1 July 2003). "Clinical and psychometric validation of an EORTC questionnaire module, the EORTC QLQ-OES18, to assess quality of life in patients with oesophageal cancer". European Journal of Cancer. 39 (10): 1384–1394. doi:10.1016/S0959-8049(03)00270-3. ISSN 0959-8049. PMID 12826041.

== Honors and awards ==
In 2021 she was elected as a fellow of the Academy of Medical Sciences.
