= Strengthening the reporting of observational studies in epidemiology =

The STROBE (STrengthening the Reporting of OBservational studies in Epidemiology) Statement is a reporting guideline including a checklist of 22 items that are considered essential for good reporting of observational studies. It was published simultaneously in several leading biomedical journals in October and November 2007 and comprises both the checklist and an explanation and elaboration article which gives examples of good reporting and provides authors with more guidance on good reporting. It is also referred to in the Uniform Requirements for Manuscripts Submitted to Biomedical Journals established by the International Committee of Medical Journal Editors and is endorsed by hundreds of biomedical journals.

== Purpose ==
The STROBE Statement was developed by the STROBE Initiative, an international collaboration of epidemiologists, methodologists, statisticians, researchers and journal editors with the aim to assist authors when writing up analytical observational studies, to support editors and reviewers when considering such articles for publication, and to help readers when critically appraising published articles.

== Extensions ==
There are many extensions to the STROBE Statement which cover a variety of different topic domains such as nutritional epidemiology, genetic association studies, rheumatology, molecular epidemiology, infectious disease molecular epidemiology, respondent-driven sampling, routinely collected health data (e.g., health administrative data, electronic health records, and registry data), antimicrobial stewardship programs, seroepidemiologic studies for influenza, medical abortion, simulation-based research, newborn infection, veterinary, and sports injury and illness.

A draft checklist for reporting observational studies in conference abstracts is also available.

== Adaptations and future ==
In 2010, three years after STROBE's publication, the original creators reconvened and deemed an update unnecessary at the time. However, since, calls have supported for the reporting guideline to be updated, similarly to other reporting guidelines (like CONSORT and PRISMA) which have been updated as needed. An assessment of extension content as well as a survey of authors of observational studies provided several areas to improve upon.

The STROBE Statement checklist is also available to use within a Writing Aid Tool add-in for Microsoft Word that includes the STROBE checklist within the software.

The STROBE Statement has also been adapted as a public, open-source repository for epidemiological research methods and reporting skills for observational studies. Epidemiologists, statisticians, and public health researchers are able to comment and edit the tool to inform future updates of the reporting guideline.

== See also ==
- CONSORT
- EQUATOR Network
