= Martin Bland =

British statistician

- Born: 6 March 1947 (age 79); Stockport, UK
- Citizenship: UK
- Education: Imperial College, London; University of London
- Known for: Bland–Altman plot
- Scientific career
- Fields: Medical statistics
- Workplaces: St. George's Hospital Medical School; University of York

John Martin Bland (born 6 March 1947), known as Martin Bland, is a British statistician. He has been professor of health statistics at the University of York since 2003. Bland is known for his work on medical measurement, particularly methodology for method comparison studies such as the Bland–Altman plot.

Bland was born in Stockport and obtained a BSc, MSc and diploma from Imperial College, London, followed by a PhD in epidemiology from the University of London. Between 1976 and 2003 he worked at St. George's Hospital Medical School, University of London.

== Books ==
- Bland, Martin (1995). An introduction to medical statistics. Oxford University Press. ISBN 978-0-19-262428-4.
- Bland, Martin; Peacock, Janet (2000). Statistical questions in evidence-based medicine. Oxford University Press. ISBN 978-0-19-262992-0.
