= List of metascience research centers and organisations =

- Association for Interdisciplinary Meta-Research & Open Science (AIMOS)
- Brazilian Metascience Research Group (BMRG)
- Centre for Journalology
- Center for Open Science
- Center for Scientific Consulting & Meta-Research in Biomedical Sciences (CECIMIB)
- Center for Scientific Integrity
- Cochrane Collaboration
- European Network for Innovation and Knowledge
- Evidence-Based Research Network (EBRNetwork)
- Interdisciplinary Meta-Research Group at The University of Melbourne, Australia
- Meta-Research Center at Tilburg University
- Meta-Research Innovation Center at Stanford (METRICS)
- NYU Meta-Research Collaborative
- Projet MiRoR Methods in Research on Research
- QUEST Center for Responsible Research of the Berlin Institute of Health
- UCMeta at the University of Canterbury
- Severance Underwood Meta-Research Center at Yonsei University
