= Science of science policy =

Interdisciplinary research area

Science of science policy (SoSP) is an emerging interdisciplinary research area that seeks to develop theoretical and empirical models of the scientific enterprise. This scientific basis can be used to help government, and society in general, make better R&D management decisions by establishing a scientifically rigorous, quantitative basis from which policy makers and researchers may assess the impacts of the nation's scientific and engineering enterprise, improve their understanding of its dynamics, and assess the likely outcomes. Examples of research in the science of science policy include models to understand the production of science, qualitative, quantitative and computational methods to estimate the impact of science, and processes for choosing from alternative science portfolios.

== Federal effort ==
The federal government of the United States has long been a supporter of SoSP. In 2006, in response to Office of Science and Technology Policy Director John H. Marburger's challenge for a new "science of science policy", the National Science and Technology Council's Subcommittee on Social, Behavioral and Economic Sciences (SBE) established an Interagency Task Group on Science of Science Policy (ITG) to serve as part of the internal deliberative process of the Subcommittee. In 2008, the SoSP ITG developed and published "The Science of Science Policy: A Federal Research Roadmap", which outlined the Federal efforts necessary for the long-term development of a science of science policy, and presented this Roadmap to the SoSP Community. The ITG's subsequent work has been guided by the questions outlined in the Roadmap and the action steps developed at the workshop. Furthermore, since 2007, the National Science Foundation, in support of academic research to advance the field, has awarded grants from the Science of Science and Innovation Policy (SciSIP) program. The SciSIP research supports and complements the Federal SoSP efforts by providing new tools with immediate relevance to policymakers.

== Science of Science and Innovation Policy program ==
The Science of Science and Innovation Policy (SciSIP) program was established at the National Science Foundation in 2005 in response to a call from John Marburger for a "specialist scholarly community" to study the science of science policy. The program has three major goals: advancing evidence-based science and innovation policy decision making; building a scientific community to study science and innovation policy; and leveraging the experience of other countries.

Between 2007 and 2011, over one hundred and thirty awards were made in five rounds of funding. The awardees include economists, sociologists, political scientists, and psychologists. Some of these awards are already showing results in the form of papers, presentations, software, and data development.

== See also ==
- Metascience
- Evidence-based policy
- Evidence-based practices
