= Open Source Media Framework =

- Developer: Adobe Systems
- Stable release: 2.0 / March 22, 2012; 14 years ago
- Written in: ActionScript 3.0
- Operating system: Cross-platform
- Type: Development Framework
- License: Mozilla Public License
- Website: sourceforge.net/adobe/osmf/

Open Source Media Framework (OSMF) is a deprecated free and open-source development framework for building video related functionality on the web and desktop. OSMF uses the ActionScript 3.0 programming language and is created by Adobe Systems.

OSMF provides support for multiple media types including video, audio, images, and SWF files, as well as plug-ins that enable additional features from third-party services, such as advertising insertion, rendering, tracking, reporting for analytics, and content delivery network (CDN) authentication.

== See also ==
- Adobe Flash Player
- Adobe Media Player
- JW Player
