= Consolidated Standards of Reporting Trials =

Reporting standards for clinical trials

Consolidated Standards of Reporting Trials (CONSORT) encompasses various initiatives developed by the CONSORT Group to alleviate the problems arising from inadequate reporting of randomized controlled trials. It is part of the larger EQUATOR Network initiative to enhance the transparency and accuracy of reporting in research.

== CONSORT Statement ==
The main product of the CONSORT Group is the CONSORT Statement, which is an evidence-based, minimum set of recommendations for reporting randomized trials. It offers a standard way for authors to prepare reports of trial findings, facilitating their complete and transparent reporting, reducing the influence of bias on their results, and aiding their critical appraisal and interpretation.

The most recent version of the Statement—the CONSORT 2010 Statement—consists of a 25-item checklist and a participant flow diagram, along with some brief descriptive text. The checklist items focus on reporting how the trial was designed, analyzed, and interpreted; the flow diagram displays the progress of all participants through the trial. The Statement has been translated into several languages.

The CONSORT "Explanation and Elaboration" document explains and illustrates the principles underlying the CONSORT Statement. It is strongly recommended that it be used in conjunction with the CONSORT Statement.

Considered an evolving document, the CONSORT Statement is subject to periodic changes as new evidence emerges. In April 2025 the CONSORT group issued an updated 'CONSORT 2025' checklist that supersedes the 2010 statement, since it adds seven items, revises three, removes one, and introduces a new open-science section covering trial registration, protocol/SAP access, data sharing, and disclosures.

=== Extensions ===
The main CONSORT Statement is based on the "standard" two-group parallel design. Extensions of the CONSORT Statement have been developed to give additional guidance for randomized trials with specific designs (e.g., cluster randomized trials, factorial trials , noninferiority and equivalence trials, pragmatic trials), data (e.g., harms, abstracts), type of target outcome, and various types of intervention (e.g., herbals, non-pharmacologic treatments, acupuncture). A number of guidelines have been designed to complement CONSORT, including TIDieR (encouraging adequate descriptions of interventions) and TIDieR-Placebo (encouraging adequate descriptions of placebo or sham controls). This list is by no means exhaustive, and work is ongoing.

== History ==
In 1993, 30 experts—medical journal editors, clinical trialists, epidemiologists, and methodologists—met in Ottawa, Canada to discuss ways of improving the reporting of randomized trials. This meeting resulted in the Standardized Reporting of Trials (SORT) statement, a 32-item checklist and flow diagram in which investigators were encouraged to report on how randomized trials were conducted.

Concurrently, and independently, another group of experts, the Asilomar Working Group on Recommendations for Reporting of Clinical Trials in the Biomedical Literature, convened in California, USA, and were working on a similar mandate. This group also published recommendations for authors reporting randomized trials.

At the suggestion of Dr. Drummond Rennie, from JAMA, in 1995 representatives from both these groups met in Chicago, USA, with the aim of merging the best of the SORT and Asilomar proposals into a single, coherent evidence-based recommendation. This resulted in the Consolidated Standards of Reporting Trials (CONSORT) Statement, which was first published in 1996. Further meetings of the CONSORT Group in 1999 and 2000 led to the publication of the revised CONSORT Statement in 2001.

Since the revision in 2001, the evidence base to inform CONSORT has grown considerably; empirical data highlighting new concerns regarding the reporting of randomized trials. Therefore, a third CONSORT Group meeting was held in 2007, resulting in publication of a newly revised CONSORT Statement and explanatory document in 2010. Users of the guideline are strongly recommended to refer to the most up-to-date version while writing or interpreting reports of clinical trials.

== Impact ==
The CONSORT Statement has gained considerable support since its inception in 1996. Over 600 journals and editorial groups worldwide now endorse it, including The Lancet, BMJ, JAMA, New England Journal of Medicine, World Association of Medical Editors, and International Committee of Medical Journal Editors. The 2001 revised Statement has been cited over 1,200 times and the accompanying explanatory document over 500 times. Another indication of CONSORT's impact is reflected in the approximately 17,500 hits per month that the CONSORT website has received. It has also recently been published as a book for those involved in the planning, conducting and interpretation of clinical trials.

A 2006 systematic review suggest that use of the CONSORT checklist is associated with improved reporting of randomized trials.

Similar initiatives to improve the reporting of other types of research have arisen after the introduction of CONSORT. They include: Strengthening the Reporting of Observational Studies in Epidemiology (STROBE), Standards for the Reporting of Diagnostic Accuracy Studies (STARD), Strengthening the Reporting of Genetic Association studies (STREGA), Preferred Reporting Items for Systematic Reviews and Meta-Analyses (PRISMA), Transparent Reporting of a multivariable model for Individual Prognosis Or Diagnosis (TRIPOD+AI), Standards for Quality Improvement Reporting Excellence (SQUIRE), among others. These reporting guidelines have been incorporated into the EQUATOR Network initiative to enhance the transparent and accurate reporting of research studies.

== See also ==
- Metascience
- STROBE
