= Preferred Reporting Items for Systematic Reviews and Meta-Analyses =

Scientific reporting standard

The PRISMA flow diagram, depicting the flow of information through the different phases of a systematic review.

PRISMA (Preferred Reporting Items for Systematic Reviews and Meta-Analyses) is an evidence-based minimum set of items aimed at helping scientific authors to report a wide array of systematic reviews and meta-analyses, primarily used to assess the benefits and harms of a health care intervention. PRISMA focuses on ways in which authors can ensure a transparent and complete reporting of this type of research. The PRISMA standard superseded the earlier QUOROM standard. It offers the replicability of a systematic literature review. Researchers have to figure out research objectives that answer the research question, state the keywords, a set of exclusion and inclusion criteria. In the review stage, relevant articles were searched, irrelevant ones are removed. Articles are analyzed according to some pre-defined categories.

== The PRISMA statement ==
The aim of the PRISMA statement is to help authors improve the reporting of systematic reviews and meta-analyses. PRISMA has mainly focused on systematic reviews and meta-analysis of randomized trials, but it can also be used as a basis for reporting reviews of other types of research (e.g., diagnostic studies, observational studies).

== History ==
In 1987, Cynthia Mulrow examined for the first time the methodological quality of a sample of 50 review articles published in four leading medical journals between 1985 and 1986. She found that none met a set of eight explicit scientific criteria, and that the lack of quality assessment of primary studies was a major pitfall in these reviews. In 1987, Sacks and colleagues evaluated the quality of 83 meta-analyses, using a scoring method that considered 23 items in six major areas: study design, combinability, control of bias, statistical analysis, sensitivity analysis, and application of results. Results of this research showed that reporting was generally poor; and pointed out an urgent need for improved methods in literature searching, quality evaluation of trials, and synthesizing of the results.

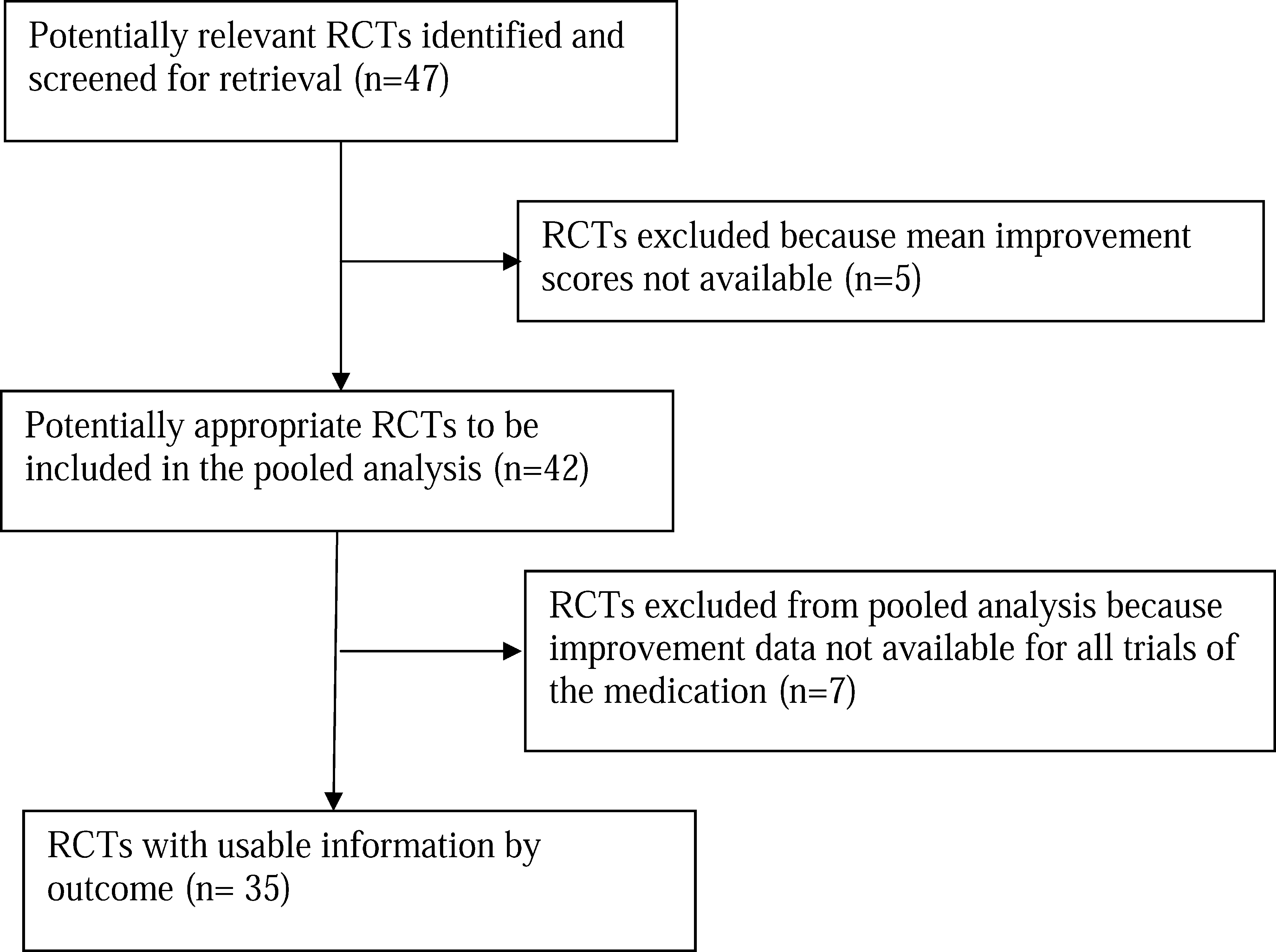
An example of a QUOROM flow diagram

In 1996, an international group of 30 clinical epidemiologists, clinicians, statisticians, editors, and researchers convened The Quality of Reporting of Meta-analyses (QUOROM) conference to address standards for improving the quality of reporting of meta-analyses of clinical randomized controlled trials (RCTs). This conference resulted in the QUOROM checklist and a flow diagram that described the preferred way to present the abstract, introduction, methods, results, and discussion sections of a report of a systematic review or a meta-analysis. Eight of the original 18 items formed the basis of the QUOROM reporting. Evaluation of reporting was organized into headings and subheadings regarding searches, selection, validity assessment, data abstraction, study characteristics, and quantitative data synthesis. The rationale behind the inclusion of such a diagram is to increase the transparency of decisions made by the researcher for including or excluding certain studies, which may subsequently introduce biases in the overall measure of effect. It subsequently became a required element in a number of medical and life science journals when submitting review papers.

In 2009, QUOROM was updated to address several conceptual and practical advances in the science of systematic reviews, and was renamed PRISMA (Preferred Reporting Items of Systematic reviews and Meta-Analyses). This was then updated by the PRISMA 2020 which includes new reporting guidance.

In 2021, a 'PRISMA for Searching' (PRISMA-S) extension was added and published, to improve the literature searches of systematic reviews, which are accentuated to "underlie the foundations of systematic review".

== Components ==
=== Checklist ===
The checklist includes 27 items pertaining to the content of a systematic review and meta-analysis, which include the title, abstract, methods, results, discussion and funding.

=== Flow diagram ===
The following is an example of a PRISMA flow diagram:

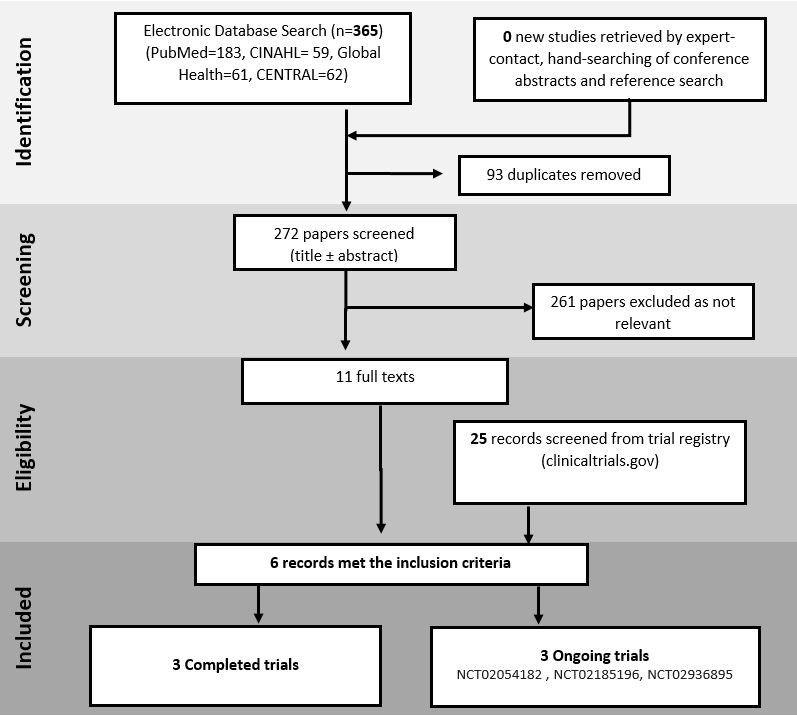
A completed PRISMA flow diagram from a published systematic review

== Impact ==
The diligent use of checklists like PRISMA is likely to improve the reporting quality of a systematic review and provide substantial transparency in the selection process of papers in a systematic review.

The PRISMA Statement has been published in several journals. Many journals publishing health research refer to PRISMA in their Instructions to Authors and some require authors to adhere to them. The PRISMA Group advised that PRISMA should replace QUOROM for those journals that endorsed QUOROM in the past.

A 2011 survey of leading medical journals evaluated the extent to which the PRISMA Statement has been incorporated into their Instructions to Authors. In a sample of 146 journals publishing systematic reviews, the PRISMA Statement was referred to in the instructions to authors for 27% of journals; more often in general and internal medicine journals (50%) than in specialty medicine journals (25%). These results showed that the uptake of PRISMA guidelines by journals was incomplete although there was improvement over time.

Approximately 174 journals in the health sciences endorse the PRISMA Statement for the reporting of systematic reviews and meta-analysis published in their collections. PRISMA has been also included as one of the tools for assessing the reporting of research within the EQUATOR Network (Enhancing the Quality and Transparency of Health Care Research), an international initiative that seeks to enhance reliability and value of medical research literature by promoting transparent and accurate reporting of research studies.

== See also ==
- Strengthening the reporting of observational studies in epidemiology
