= John Ioannidis =

Greek-American scientist (born 1965)

- Ιωάννης Ιωαννίδης
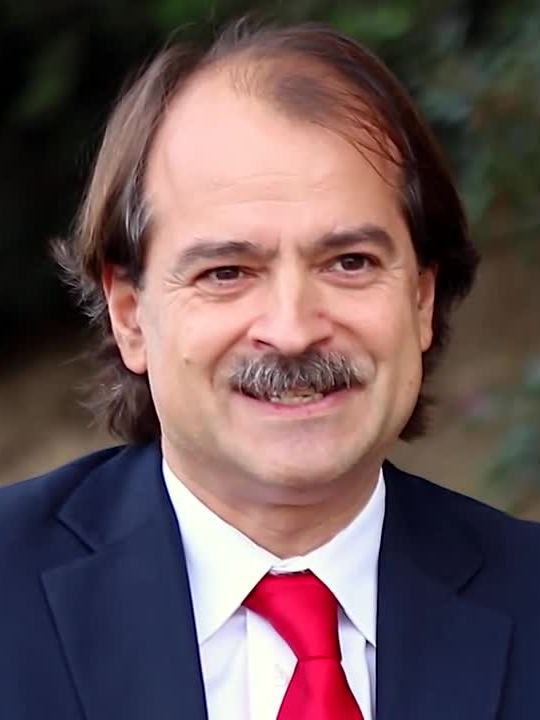
- Ioannidis in 2015
- Born: August 21, 1965 (age 61); New York City, New York, U.S.
- Education: University of Athens (MD, PhD)
- Known for: Metascience
- Scientific career
- Fields: Medicine, metascience
- Workplaces: Stanford School of Medicine

John P. A. Ioannidis (/ˌiːəˈniːdɪs/ EE-ə-NEE-diss; Greek: Ιωάννης Ιωαννίδης, pronounced [i.oˈanis i.oaˈniðis]; born 21 August 1965) is a Greek-American physician-scientist, writer, and Stanford University professor who has made contributions to evidence-based medicine, epidemiology, and clinical research. Ioannidis studies scientific research itself (meta-research) primarily in clinical medicine and the social sciences.

He has served on the editorial board of over twenty scientific journals including Journal of the American Medical Association (JAMA), Journal of the National Cancer Institute (JNCI), and The Lancet.

Ioannidis's 2005 essay "Why Most Published Research Findings Are False" was the most-accessed article in the history of Public Library of Science (PLOS) as of 2020, with more than three million views.

Ioannidis was a prominent opponent of lockdowns during the COVID-19 pandemic, and he has been accused of promoting conspiracy theories about COVID-19 policies and public health and safety measures.

== Early life and education ==
Born in New York City in 1965, Ioannidis was raised in Athens, Greece. He was valedictorian of his class at Athens College, graduating in 1984, and won a number of awards, including the National Award of the Greek Mathematical Society. He graduated in the top rank of his class at the University of Athens Medical School (1990), then attended Harvard University for his medical residency in internal medicine. He did a fellowship at Tufts University for infectious disease and received a PhD in biopathology at the University of Athens (1996).

== Career ==
He is a highly cited medical researcher, with an h-index of 278 on Google Scholar in January 2026.

From 1998 to 2010, Ioannidis was chairman of the Department of Hygiene and Epidemiology, University of Ioannina School of Medicine. In 2002, he became an adjunct professor at Tufts University School of Medicine. He has also been president of the Society for Research Synthesis Methodology.

He holds four academic appointments at Stanford University: Professor of Medicine, Professor of Epidemiology and Population Health, Professor (by courtesy) of Statistics and Professor (by courtesy) of Biomedical Data Science. He is director of the Stanford Prevention Research Center, and co-director, along with Steven N. Goodman, of the Meta-Research Innovation Center at Stanford.

== Research ==
John Ioannidis (2005), "Why Most Published Research Findings Are False"

Ioannidis's 2005 paper "Why Most Published Research Findings Are False" is the most downloaded paper in the Public Library of Science. In the paper, Ioannidis says that most published research does not meet good scientific standards of evidence. Ioannidis has also described the replication crisis in diverse scientific fields including genetics, clinical trials, neuroscience, and nutrition. His work has aimed to identify solutions to problems in research, and on how to perform research more optimally. In a series of five papers about research published in The Lancet and titled "Research: increasing value, reducing waste", Ioannidis co-authored papers discussing prioritization, transparency and the assessment of existing evidence when making decisions for the funding of research so that they meet the needs of users of research and examining how to correct weaknesses in research design, methods, and analysis by involving experienced statisticians and methodologists and avoiding stakeholders with conflicts of interest.

Ioannidis's research at Stanford focuses on meta-analysis and meta-research – the study of studies. Thomas Trikalinos and Ioannidis coined the term Proteus phenomenon to describe tendency for early studies on a subject to find larger effect than later ones.

He was an early and influential public critic of Theranos, the now-fallen Silicon Valley blood test startup that at its height was valued at up to $9 billion. He criticized it for "stealth research" that it had not made available for other scientists to review.

=== Meta-research ===
Ioannidis has defined meta-research to include "thematic areas of methods, reporting, reproducibility, evaluation, and incentives (how to do, report, verify, correct, and reward science)". He has performed large-scale assessments of the presence of reproducible and transparent research indicators such as data sharing, code sharing, protocol registration, declaration of funding and conflicts of interest in biomedical sciences, social sciences, and psychology. He has led or co-led efforts to define and improve reproducibility in science, e.g. computational reproducibility, and to reduce research waste in study design, conduct, and analysis. Ioannidis has co-authored the Manifesto for Reproducible Science, an eight-page document illuminating the need to fix the flaws in the current scientific process and mitigate the "reproducibility crisis" in science.

In "Why Most Published Research Findings are False" (2005), Ioannidis focused on why most published research findings cannot be validated. In a later paper on PLOS Medicine (2014), he discusses what can be done to improve this situation and make more published research findings to be true and in a third paper (2016) he showed why clinical research in particular is usually not useful and how this can be amended. In the first of the three PLOS papers he stated that "a research finding is less likely to be true when the studies conducted in a field are smaller; when effect sizes are smaller; when there is a greater number and lesser preselection of tested relationships; where there is greater flexibility in designs, definitions, outcomes, and analytical modes; when there is greater financial and other interest and prejudice; and when more teams are involved in a scientific field in chase of statistical significance". In the second paper, he discussed solutions: "adoption of large-scale collaborative research; replication culture; registration; sharing; reproducibility practices; better statistical methods; standardization of definitions and analyses; more appropriate (usually more stringent) statistical thresholds; and improvement in study design standards, peer review, reporting and dissemination of research, and training of the scientific workforce". In the third paper, he proposed eight features that are important for useful clinical research: problem base, context placement, information gain, pragmatism, patient-centeredness, value for money, feasibility, and transparency. Ioannidis was invited to present his findings as a keynote speaker at the "Evidence Live 2016" conference, hosted jointly by the Centre for Evidence-Based Medicine (CEBM) at the Nuffield Department of Primary Care Health Sciences, University of Oxford and the BMJ.

=== Meta-analysis ===
Ioannidis has developed and popularized several methods for meta-analysis and has made several conceptual advances in this field. These include methods for assessing heterogeneity and its uncertainty, methods for meta-analysis involving multiple treatments, methods and processes for umbrella reviews, and several approaches to identifying bias and adjusting the results of meta-analyses for bias, such as publication bias and reporting bias resulting in funnel-plot asymmetry. He has also alerted about the misuse and misinterpretation of bias tests. Along with David Chavalarias, he catalogued 235 biases across the entire publication record of biomedical research. Ioannidis has been critical of flawed, misleading and redundant meta-analyses, estimating that few meta-analyses in medicine are both bias-free and clinically useful. He has performed empirical evaluations of the concordance of results between meta-analyses and large trials and between randomized trials and non-randomized studies.

=== Evidence-based medicine ===
Ioannidis has been one of the strong proponents and earlier advocates of evidence-based medicine. However, he has alerted that, over the years, as evidence-based medicine acquired more prominence and influence, it was hijacked to serve other agendas that are often biased. In an essay written to honor his late mentor David Sackett, he stated that:

Influential randomized trials are largely done by and for the benefit of the industry. Meta-analyses and guidelines have become a factory, mostly also serving vested interests. National and federal research funds are funneled almost exclusively to research with little relevance to health outcomes. We have supported the growth of principal investigators who excel primarily as managers absorbing more money. Diagnosis and prognosis research and efforts to individualize treatment have fueled recurrent spurious promises. Risk factor epidemiology has excelled in salami-sliced, data-dredged articles with gift authorship and has become adept to dictating policy from spurious evidence. Under market pressure, clinical medicine has been transformed to finance-based medicine. In many places, medicine and health care are wasting societal resources and becoming a threat to human well-being. Science denialism and quacks are also flourishing and leading more people astray in their life choices, including health. Evidence-based medicine still remains an unmet goal, worthy to be attained.

He has described four inter-related problems that create what he calls the Medical Misinformation Mess:

First, much published medical research is not reliable or is of uncertain reliability, offers no benefit to patients, or is not useful to decision makers. Second, most healthcare professionals are not aware of this problem. Third, they also lack the skills necessary to evaluate the reliability and usefulness of medical evidence. Finally, patients and families frequently lack relevant, accurate medical evidence and skilled guidance at the time of medical decision-making.

He has supported these views by contributing to a meta-epidemiological study which found that only 1 in 20 interventions tested in Cochrane Reviews have benefits that are supported by high-quality evidence and a related study showing that the quality of this evidence does not seem to improve over time.

=== Statistical methods and inference ===
Ioannidis has made methodological and conceptual contributions to the debates surrounding the use and misuse of statistical methods and inference. He has been an advocate of the approach to redefine statistical significance by requesting more stringent statistical significance thresholds; he has proposed and empirically validated stringent thresholds for genome-wide significance in genetics; and has been critical of the approach to entirely abandon statistical significance.

=== Reporting guidelines ===
Ioannidis has contributed to several influential guidelines for reporting different types of research, such as PRISMA for meta-analyses, TRIPOD for multivariable prognostic and diagnostic models, and others on clinical trials and observational research. He is the lead author of the CONSORT for harms, a guideline that provides guidance on how to properly report on harms in randomized trials and has contributed to PRISMA for harms, a guideline for reporting of harms in meta-analyses.

=== Genetic and molecular epidemiology ===
Ioannidis was one of the first to advocate the use of meta-analysis in genetic epidemiology to assess replication and the incorporation of meta-analysis in large-scale consortia of multiple investigators performing genome-wide association studies. He led and contributed to many such efforts in diverse areas of genetic epidemiology and in other areas of molecular epidemiology.

=== Nutrition ===
Ioannidis has been critical of nutritional epidemiology research practices and has recommended reforms to improve the credibility of research in the field. By means of empirical reviews, he has highlighted that there are studies suggesting that almost every nutrient is associated with cancer risk, which is an implausible situation He has also suggested that more attention is needed for proper disclosures of both financial and non-financial conflicts of interest in nutrition research. He also co-authored the DIETFITS randomized trial that showed no difference between a low-fat and a low-carb diet.

=== Association studies and big data ===
In an effort to improve the credibility of research on risk factors, Ioannidis has proposed that exposure-wide or environment-wide association studies should be performed and he has outlined the similarities and differences between such studies and genome-wide association studies in genetics. By assessing all risk factors together instead of one at a time, this practice aims to reduce selective reporting and publication bias. He has also advocated for the use of large national population databases with systematically collected data to minimize bias and improve yield of trustworthy discoveries. He has worked on the potential uses of such approaches in big data and artificial intelligence.

=== Psychiatry ===
Ioannidis has performed critical assessments of the evidence behind mental health interventions (pharmacotherapy and psychotherapy). He co-authored a network meta-analysis on more than 500 randomized trials of anti-depressants showing a modest benefit from these medications for major depression. He has identified the potential for sponsorship bias in meta-analyses in mental health and has empirically assessed the totality of meta-analyses on mental health interventions, estimating that beneficial effects do exist, but they tend to be modest and thus a research agenda is needed to identify more effective interventions.

=== Neuroscience ===
Along with colleagues, Ioannidis has performed empirical evaluations and meta-research assessments of large numbers of scientific studies in neuroscience and have found that lack of power is a very common problem, leading to both false-negatives (the inability to discover true signals) and false-positives (finding spurious signals).

=== Economics ===
In empirical assessments of all meta-analyses that have been conducted on economics topics, Ioannidis and colleagues have found that most of the studies in these fields are small and under-powered. Using bias detection and correction methods, they have concluded that nearly 80% of the reported effects in the empirical economics literature is exaggerated; typically by a factor of two, and with one-third inflated by a factor of four or more.

== Editorial appointments ==
Ioannidis has served on the editorial board of a number of scientific journals, including the European Journal of Clinical Investigation (editor-in-chief, 2010–2019), BMC Medicine, International Journal of Epidemiology, Journal of the American Medical Association, Journal of Clinical Epidemiology, Journal of Infectious Diseases, International Journal of Molecular Epidemiology and Genetics, International Journal of Epidemiology, Journal of Translational Medicine, Journal of Evaluation in Clinical Practice, Clinical Chemistry, Physiological Reviews, Royal Society Open Science, Research Integrity and Peer Review, BioMed Central Infectious Diseases, Biomarker Research, Diagnostic and Prognostic Research, PLoS Medicine, PLoS Biology, The Lancet, Annals of Internal Medicine, JNCI, and Science Translational Medicine.

== COVID-19 ==
In an editorial on STAT published March 17, 2020, Ioannidis wondered whether the global response to the COVID-19 pandemic may be a "once-in-a-century evidence fiasco" and asked for obtaining more reliable data to deal with the pandemic. He made a rough estimation that the coronavirus could cause 10,000 U.S. deaths if it infected 1% of the U.S. population, but argued that more data was needed to determine how widely the virus would spread. The virus in fact eventually became widely disseminated, and would cause more than one million deaths in the U.S. Ioannidis expressed doubt that vaccines or treatments would be developed and tested in time to affect how the pandemic would unfold. Marc Lipsitch, Director of the Center for Communicable Disease Dynamics at the Harvard T.H. Chan School of Public Health, objected to Ioannidis's characterization of the global response in a reply that was published on STAT the next day after Ioannidis's.

In March 2020, Ioannidis tried to organize a meeting at the White House where he and colleagues would caution President Donald Trump against "shutting down the country for [a] very long time and jeopardizing so many lives in doing this", according to a proposal he submitted. The meeting did not come to pass, but on March 28, after Trump said he wanted the country reopened by Easter, Ioannidis wrote to his colleagues, "I think our ideas have inflitrated [sic] the White House regardless".

Ioannidis widely promoted a study of which he had been co-author, "COVID-19 Antibody Seroprevalence in Santa Clara County, California", released as a preprint on April 17, 2020. It asserted that Santa Clara County's number of infections was between 50 and 85 times higher than the official count, putting the virus's fatality rate as low as 0.1% to 0.2%. (Note: On May 11, the study's authors revised the study with new figures stating the number of infections was 54 times higher than the official count.) Ioannidis concluded from the study that the coronavirus is "not the apocalyptic problem we thought". The message found favor with right-wing media outlets, but the paper drew criticism from a number of epidemiologists who said its testing was inaccurate and its methods were sloppy. Writing for Wired, David H. Freedman said that the Santa Clara study compromised Ioannidis's previously excellent reputation and meant that future generations of scientists may remember him as "the fringe scientist who pumped up a bad study that supported a crazy right-wing conspiracy theory in the middle of a massive health crisis". Ioannidis has also promoted the idea that there were financial incentives to put COVID-19 on death certificates and as such, they were unreliable during the pandemic, as well as the idea that doctors killed COVID-19 patients through premature intubations. Both of these beliefs contradict the available evidence.

It was later reported that the study received $5,000 in funding from the founder of the JetBlue airline, which led to criticism over a potential conflict of interest. In a guest opinion article in Scientific American, former colleagues of Ioannidis wrote that a legal firm had determined he had no financial conflict. A review by the Stanford School of Medicine faulted the study for shortcomings including a public perception of a conflict of interest, but found "no evidence that any of the study funders influenced the design, execution, or reporting of the study".

Amid controversy over his COVID-19 work and his frequent televised interviews, Ioannidis claims to have been harassed in memes and emails, including one falsely claiming his mother died of COVID-19. Some scientists and commentators voiced concerns over the backlash and the highly politicized scientific dispute in general.

In March 2021 Ioannidis estimated the global infection fatality rate from COVID-19 at 0.15%, in an article in the European Journal of Clinical Investigation (EJCI). In an article in Science-Based Medicine, David Gorski said that the EJCI article included ad hominem criticisms against a co-author of a higher estimate who had criticized his work on Twitter.

In February 2022 Ioannidis co-authored a paper examining the role of indoor and outdoor air quality in the spread of SARS-CoV-2, which concluded that environmental health may be a crucial component in the prevention of COVID-19 and suggested preventive measures such as indoor CO_{2} monitoring and mechanical ventilation.

In 2022, Ioannidis authored a paper in BMJ Open arguing that signatories of the Great Barrington Declaration were shunned as a fringe minority by those in favor of the John Snow Memorandum. According to him, the latter used their large numbers of followers on Twitter and other social media and op-eds to shape a scientific groupthink against the former, who had less influence as measured by the Kardashian Index. The BMJ published responses to his paper, including a comment by Gavin Yamey, David Gorski, and Gideon Meyerowitz-Katz which argued that Ioannidis's paper featured "factual errors, statistical shortcomings, failure to protect the named research subjects from harm, and potentially undeclared conflicts of interest that entirely undermine the analysis presented". In the same exchange of comments on The BMJ, Ioannidis addressed the concerns of Yamey, Gorski and Meyerovitz-Katz in his "Fourth set of replies", additionally stating that his "COVID-19 papers have been cited about 5 thousand times in the scientific literature by tens of thousands of scientists and were discussed by millions of people," and dismissed conflict of interest by asserting that he did not sign the Great Barrington Declaration or any other petition or signature collection on COVID-19, as he is against the notion that scientific matters and evidence could be decided by signature collections and prefers these matters be handled by heavily moderated public debates.

== Reception ==
In the 2000s and 2010s, during a period of regular publications from Ioannidis on the replication crisis in science, observers in the popular press commented that Ioannidis "may be one of the most influential scientists alive", and was "cementing his role as one of medicine's top mythbusters".

In 2014, The Economist featured Ioannidis and Steven Goodman in an article on the Meta-Research Innovation Center at Stanford, and George Johnson of the New York Times wrote an article on the importance of reproducible research, profiling Ioannidis's two 2005 papers as playing a critical role in raising concern about the issue in the scientific community, as later expressed by the journal Nature.

This acclaim continued into the late 2010s, with Wired mentionining Ioannidis as "arguably the replication crisis' chief inquisitor". His research on replicability reached multiple fields, including the specious statistics behind some drug subscriptions, and findings from Ioannidis that only a minority of widely cited health research studies carried out over the last decade could be replicated, with at least 1 in 6 actually being contradicted by later studies,. Elsevier featured his analogy of reproducibility in research to "taming a complex beast". He was also an early critic of Theranos.

However, Ioannidis's popularity began to wane during the COVID-19 pandemic, with some peers and colleagues criticizing his rhetoric and seeming loss of objectivity compared to his prior work. A March 2020 editorial in STAT news was particularly criticized, where he predicted the pandemic would result in 10,000 deaths at most. In 2021, David Gorski's article "What the heck happened to John Ioannidis?" described statements by Ioannidis about COVID-19 as inflammatory and politically charged, and said Ioannidis had made egregious ad hominem attacks. Gorski called Ioannidis "a cautionary tale of how even science watchdogs can fall prey to hubris". Ioannidis later denied that he mocked other researchers who expressed concern about the death toll of the pandemic.

== Awards and honors ==
Ioannidis has received elected membership to the National Academy of Medicine, the European Academy of Sciences and Arts, the European Academy of Cancer Sciences, the American Epidemiological Society and the Association of American Physicians. For the 2022-2023 term, he is vice-president and president-elect of the Association of American Physicians.

- Honorary degree, McMaster University (2024)
- Albert Stuyvenberg Medal, European Society for Clinical Investigation (2021)
- Einstein fellow, Berlin Institute of Health, Einstein Stiftung and Stiftung Charite (2019)
- Epiphany Science Courage Award, Novim (inaugural award) (2018)
- Chanchlani Award for Global Health, McMaster University (2017)
- David-Sackett-Preis, Deutsche Netzwerk Evidenzbasierte Medizin (2017)
- Lifetime Achievement Award, Hellenic Society for Pharmacological Science (2016)
- Medal for Distinguished Service, Teachers College, Columbia University (2015)
- European Award for Excellence in Clinical Science, European Society for Clinical Investigation (2007)

== See also ==
- Evidence-based medicine
- Open science
- Publication bias
- Replication crisis
- Reproducibility Project
- Composite index
