= Ie-Ming Shih =

American pathologist and cancer researcher

Ie-Ming Shih is an American pathologist and cancer researcher. He is the Richard W. TeLinde Distinguished Professor in the Department of Gynecology and Obstetrics at the Johns Hopkins University School of Medicine.

== Education and career ==
in 1988, Shih received his medical degree from Taipei Medical University. In 1993, he did a Ph.D. in biomedical science from the University of Pennsylvania.

Shih joined the faculty of Johns Hopkins University School of Medicine in 2001. He holds appointments in the departments of Gynecology and Obstetrics and Pathology and was appointed the Richard W. TeLinde Distinguished Professor in 2014.

Shih is a principal investigator of the National Cancer Institute's Specialized Program of Research Excellence (SPORE) in ovarian cancer.

In 2020, Shih received the Rosalind Franklin Prize for Excellence in Ovarian Cancer Research from the Ovarian Cancer Research Alliance. In 2026, he was named a recipient of the Pershing Square Foundation's Lotus Award for a research project investigating the biological and clinical significance of ovarian cancer precursor lesions in women with BRCA1 or BRCA2 mutations.

== Research ==
Shih researched on the origins of epithelial ovarian cancersparticularly high-grade serous carcinoma. His research contributed to evidence that high-grade serous carcinomas originate in the epithelium of the fallopian tube rather than in the ovary itself.

In a 2018 study published in Science Translational Medicine, he evaluated Pap test fluid and other liquid biopsy samples for the detection of endometrial and ovarian cancers. The study demonstrated that genetic analysis of material collected during routine cervical screening could detect molecular evidence of these cancers, including some early-stage cases.

In a 2010 study published in Science, Shih and colleagues reported frequent ARID1A mutations in ovarian clear cell carcinoma.

In a 2015 study published in Cancer Cell, Shih reported that inhibition of spleen tyrosine kinase (SYK) increased the sensitivity of ovarian cancer cells to paclitaxel. The study identified a potential therapeutic approach for addressing chemotherapy resistance.

In a 2017 study published in the New England Journal of Medicine, he and colleagues identified somatic mutations in endometriotic lesions from patients without cancer. The mutations included alterations in cancer-associated genes such as KRAS, ARID1A, and PIK3CA.

In 1998, he and Robert J. Kurman published a study characterizing epithelioid trophoblastic tumor (ETT) as a distinct type of gestational trophoblastic neoplasm, separate from choriocarcinoma and placental-site trophoblastic tumor.

== Selected publications ==
- Shih, Ie-Ming, and M. Herman Chui. "The pathogenesis of epithelial ovarian cancer." Annual Review of Pathology (2026).
- Chang, T. Y., et al. "Integrated spatial analysis of ovarian cancer." Cancer Research (2026).
- Wang, T. L., and Ie-Ming Shih. "Harnessing immune cells to leverage PARP inhibitors." Cell 187 (2024): 4829–4830.
- Yu, Z. C., et al. "Temozolomide sensitizes ARID1A-mutated cancers to PARP inhibitors." Cancer Research (2023).
- Wang, Y., et al. "Spatial transcriptomic analysis of ovarian cancer precursors reveals reactivation of IGFBP2 during pathogenesis." Cancer Research (2022).
- Shih, Ie-Ming, Yuxuan Wang, and Tian-Li Wang. "The origin of ovarian cancer species and precancerous landscape." The American Journal of Pathology 191 (2021): 26–39.
- Wang, Y., K. Nicholes, and Ie-Ming Shih. "The origin and pathogenesis of endometriosis." Annual Review of Pathology 15 (2020): 71–95.
- Rahmanto, Y. S., et al. "Inactivation of Arid1a in the endometrium is associated with endometrioid tumorigenesis through transcriptional reprogramming." Nature Communications 11 (2020): 2717.
- Wang, Y., et al. "Evaluation of liquid from the Papanicolaou test and other liquid biopsies for the detection of endometrial and ovarian cancers." Science Translational Medicine 10 (2018): eaap8793.
- Anglesio, M. S., et al. "Cancer-Associated Mutations in Endometriosis without Cancer." New England Journal of Medicine 376 (2017): 1835–1848.
- Zhang, H., et al. "Integrated proteogenomic characterization of human high-grade serous ovarian cancer." Cell 166 (2016): 755–765.
- Yu, Y., et al. "Inhibition of spleen tyrosine kinase potentiates paclitaxel-induced cytotoxicity in ovarian cancer cells by stabilizing microtubules." Cancer Cell 28 (2015): 82–96.
- Jones, S., et al. "Frequent mutations of chromatin remodeling gene ARID1A in ovarian clear cell carcinoma." Science 330 (2010): 228–231.
- Wiegand, K. C., et al. "ARID1A gene mutations in endometriosis-associated ovarian carcinomas." New England Journal of Medicine (2010).
- Shih, Ie-Ming. "Gestational trophoblastic neoplasia—pathogenesis and potential therapeutic targets." The Lancet Oncology 8 (2007): 642–650.
- Shih, Ie-Ming, et al. "Assessing tumors in living animals through measurement of urinary beta-human chorionic gonadotropin." Nature Medicine 6 (2000): 711–714.
