= Gustaf Ljungman =

Swedish pediatric oncologist

- Born: Gustaf Erland Ljungman
- Citizenship: Swedish
- Known for: Research on childhood cancer, pediatric pain and cancer genomics
- Scientific career
- Fields: Pediatrics, pediatric oncology, precision medicine, pain management
- Workplaces: Uppsala University; Uppsala University Hospital

Gustaf Erland Ljungman is a Swedish pediatrician, pediatric oncologist and medical researcher. He is a professor of pediatrics at Uppsala University and a senior consultant in pediatric oncology at Uppsala University Hospital.

Ljungman is the national clinical lead and chair of the steering committee of the Swedish Childhood Tumor Biobank.

== Career ==
Ljungman is affiliated with the Department of Women's and Children's Health at Uppsala University, where he is a professor in pediatric oncological and neurological research. He holds the Swedish academic qualification of Docent and has worked as a senior consultant in pediatric oncology at Uppsala University Hospital.

In a European assessment of childhood cancer research published in 2011, he was identified as a consultant and associate professor representing pediatric oncology research in Uppsala.

He has also served as a representative of the Swedish Childhood Tumor Biobank on the steering committee of the Swedish Childhood Cancer Registry.

== Research ==
A 1999 study published in Acta Paediatrica examined pain experiences among children and adolescents with cancer and their parents. The research considered patient and family perspectives on pain associated with illness and medical procedures.

In 2000, Ljungman and colleagues published a study in Pediatrics investigating the use of intranasal midazolam to reduce anxiety associated with medical procedures in children.

A 2023 article in the Journal of Translational Medicine, co-authored by Ljungman, described the biobank's organization, sample collection procedures, genomic characterization methods and framework for providing research access to biological material and associated data.

In 2024, Ljungman examined the diagnostic yield and clinical implications of germline sequencing in children with central nervous system and extracranial solid tumors. The study involved 309 patients and investigated the identification of inherited cancer-predisposition conditions. Cancer-predisposition diagnoses were identified in 35 patients, with findings informing surveillance and treatment recommendations in a proportion of cases.
