= Treatment effect =

Treatment effect may refer to:

- Design of experiments
- Average treatment effect
- Multivalued treatment
