= Steven Goodman =

Steven Goodman may refer to:

- Steven N. Goodman, American professor of epidemiology and population health
- Steven M. Goodman (born 1957), American conservation biologist
- Steve Goodman (1948–1984), American folk and country singer-songwriter
