= European Society for Clinical Investigation =

The European Society for Clinical Investigation (ESCI) was founded on February 12, 1967, as a pan-European society of clinicians and scientists. The Society covers all the topics of biomedical sciences and aims to create a common platform for researchers in fundamental sciences (e.g., genetics, biochemistry, physiology...) and applied clinical medicine (e.g., oncology, cardiology, neurology...) More recently, the Society has embraced a cross-sectional and future-oriented vision, including topics like bioinformatics, digital health, personalized medicine and gender medicine. The term clinical investigation should be therefore interpreted widely, including the whole biomedical research from bench-to-bedside and vice versa.

== Objectives ==
The main objective of ESCI is to lead clinical and translational research across Europe. The Society pursues this objective through the following actions:

- the creation of a common language between fundamental and applied sciences,
- the promotion of scientific method applied to clinical research,
- the improvement of scientific standards to ensure reproducibility, sustainability and justice of biomedical research,
- the creation of a solid network among its members, based on mutual support and collaboration.

== European Journal of Clinical Investigation ==
ESCI is associated to the monthly publication European Journal of Clinical Investigation (EJCI), a peer-reviewed scientific journal, publishing articles in all the fields of biomedical sciences and clinical research. EJCI accepts original research, research letters, systematic reviews, meta-analyses, narrative reviews, editorial and commentaries from all over the world. significant papers in the field of clinical investigation. The current (2024) journal impact factor is 3.6. EJCI ranks Q1 in the field "General & Internal Medicine" and Q2 in "Research & Experimental Medicine".

== Awards ==
Every year, ESCI gives two awards and money prizes for the best basic and clinical research articles of the year published in European Journal of Clinical Investigation (EJCI). A significant part of the research must have been performed in Europe. The recipient of each of the awards delivers a plenary lecture during the Annual Scientific Meeting of ESCI, summarising the work for which the award was given.

Previous winners of the ESCI Awards

Year	Awardee
2025	Vivak Parkash (Clinical research) & Ana Raquel Esteves (Basic research)
2024	Nurulamin Noor (Clinical research) & Giampaolo Morciano (Basic research)
2023	Daniel Kotlarz (Clinical research) & Christina Garcia Caceres (Basic research)
2022	Margherita Giannini (Clinical research) & Marina Garcia Macia (Basic research)
2021	Luca Liberale (Clinical research) & Manuela Ferreira (Basic research)
2020	Fabrizio Montecucco (Clinical research) & Guadalupe Sabio (Basic research)
2019	Amaia Roderíguez (Clinical research) & Rubén Nogueiras Pozo (Basic research)
2018	Victoria Catalán (Clinical research) & Miguel López (Basic research)
2017	Gemma Chiva-Blanch, Oliver Soehnlein
2016	Marjolein van Egmond, Antoine Muchir
2015	Danuta Zapolska-Downar, Klaus Distelmaier
2014	Dirk Schübeler, Xenofon Baraliakos
2013	Luca Scorrano, Mihai G. Netea
2012	Triantafyllos Chavakis
2011	Caetano Reis e Sousa, Georg Schett
2010	Reuven Agami, I. Sadaf Farooqi
2009	Josef M Penninger
2008	László Nagy
2007	John PA Ioannidis
2006	Michael Roden
2005	Lars Fugger
2004	Allan Flyvbjerg
2003	Raphael Scharfmann
2002	Hugh Edward Montgomery
2001	Hans C Clevers
2000	Seppo Ylä-Herttuala
1999	Guido Poli
1998	Anthony HV Schapira
1997	Irene Virgolini
1996	Paolo Golino
1995	Peter Valent
1994	Bo Angelina
1993	Thomas F. Lüscher
1992	Roberto Montesano
1991	René RP de Vries
1990	Douglas Roland Higgs
1989	Daniel P Lew
1988	Anthony W Segal
1987	Gian Franco Bottazzo
1986	Lars-Inge Larsson
1985	Rolf M Zinkernagel
1984	Pierre Corvol & J Ménard
1983	Fritz R Bühler
1982	GG Rousseau
1981	Timothy J Peters
1980	Alberto Malliani
1979	Jens F Rehfeld
1978	Lelio Orci
1977	David JH Brock
1976	Jean-François Bach

== Annual Scientific Meeting ==
ESCI organizes an annual scientific meeting. ESCI awards travel grants for young scientists to attend the annual meeting.

Year	Location
2020	Bari, Italy
2019	Coimbra, Portugal
2018	Barcelona, Spain
2017	Genoa, Italy
2016	Paris, France
2015	Cluj-Napoca, Romania
2014	Utrecht, The Netherlands
2013	Albufeira, Portugal
2012	Budapest, Hungary
2011	Heraklion, Greece
2010	Bari, Italy
2009	Frankfurt, Germany
2008	Geneva, Switzerland
2007	Uppsala, Sweden
2006	Prague, Czech Republic
2005	Athens, Greece
2004	Utrecht, The Netherlands

== Presidents of ESCI ==
Year	President
2019–Present	Paulo Oliveira (Coimbra, Portugal)
2015 - 2019	Hendrik Nathoe (Utrecht, The Netherlands)
2011 - 2015	Piero Portincasa (Bari, Italy)
2008 - 2011	George P. Chrousos (Athens, Greece)
2005 - 2008	Joannes J.M. Marx (Utrecht, The Netherlands)
2002 - 2005	Heinrich M. Schulte (Hamburg, Germany)
1999 - 2002	Lina Badimon (Barcelona, Spain)
1996 - 1999	A.E. Pontiroli (Italy)
1993 - 1996	J. F. Martin (United Kingdom)
1990 - 1993	A. C. Nieuwenhuijzen Kruseman
1987 - 1990	A.M. McGregor
