= Steven N. Goodman =

American epidemiologist

- Citizenship: American
- Education: AB, Harvard College (1976); MD, New York University School of Medicine; MHS, Johns Hopkins School of Public Health; PhD, Johns Hopkins School of Public Health (1989)
- Known for: P-value fallacy, Bayes factor in medicine, research reproducibility
- Awards: Myrto Lefkopoulou Distinguished Lecturer (2000); Spinoza Chair in Medicine (2016); Abraham Lilienfeld Award (2019); National Academy of Medicine (2020)
- Scientific career
- Fields: Epidemiology, Biostatistics, Metascience
- Workplaces: Stanford School of Medicine; Johns Hopkins School of Medicine
- Thesis: Evidence and Clinical Trials (1989)
- Doctoral advisor: Richard Royall
- Other academic advisors: Curt Meinert

Steven N. Goodman (born 1954) is an American epidemiologist and Professor of Epidemiology and Population Health and of Medicine at the Stanford School of Medicine, where he serves as Associate Dean of Clinical and Translational Research. He is co-founder and co-director of the Meta-Research Innovation Center at Stanford (METRICS), a center dedicated to studying and improving the reproducibility and efficiency of biomedical research, alongside John Ioannidis. He is also founder and director of the Stanford Program on Research Rigor and Reproducibility.

Goodman has made extensive contributions to the foundations of scientific and statistical inference within the biosciences. In 1999, he coined the term "p-value fallacy" in a pair of landmark papers arguing for the adoption of Bayesian methods in medical research. He is a sibling of journalist and Democracy Now! host Amy Goodman and journalist David Goodman.

== Education and career ==
Goodman received his AB in Biochemistry and Applied Mathematics from Harvard College in 1976, his MD from New York University School of Medicine, and his MHS and PhD in Biostatistics from the Johns Hopkins Bloomberg School of Public Health, completing his doctoral dissertation Evidence and Clinical Trials in 1989 under the supervision of Richard Royall. He completed a residency in pediatrics at St. Louis Children's Hospital, Washington University School of Medicine, and holds board certification in General Pediatrics from the American Board of Pediatrics.

From 1989 to 2011, Goodman served on the faculties of the Johns Hopkins School of Medicine and the Johns Hopkins Bloomberg School of Public Health, where he was co-director of the doctoral program in Epidemiology and Director of the Division of Biostatistics and Bioinformatics in the Department of Oncology (2007–2010). He joined the Stanford School of Medicine faculty in 2011.

Goodman has been a senior statistical editor of the Annals of Internal Medicine since 1987 and served as Editor of Clinical Trials: Journal of the Society for Clinical Trials from 2004 to 2013. He chaired the Methodology Committee of the Patient-Centered Outcomes Research Institute (PCORI) until 2024, where he led their open science and data sharing efforts, and has served as scientific advisor for the national Blue Cross–Blue Shield Technology Assessment Program since 2004. He has served on numerous National Academies committees, including a committee on vaccine safety, a 2012 committee on drug safety (which he chaired), and a 2014 committee on sharing data from clinical trials.

== Research ==
=== Statistical inference and the p-value ===
Goodman's research has centered on the proper measurement, conceptualization, and synthesis of research evidence, with particular emphasis on Bayesian approaches. His early work examined the historical debate between R. A. Fisher's approach to p-values and the Neyman–Pearson hypothesis testing framework, arguing that the combination of the two methods had led to widespread misunderstanding of statistical evidence in medicine.

In 1999, Goodman published his most cited work, a two-part series in the Annals of Internal Medicine titled "Toward Evidence-Based Medical Statistics," in which he identified what he called the "P value fallacy"—the widespread misinterpretation of p-values as direct measures of the probability that a hypothesis is true—and proposed the Bayes factor as a more interpretable alternative for quantifying statistical evidence. He further elaborated on these themes in subsequent publications advocating for Bayesian reasoning in clinical research. His 2008 paper "A Dirty Dozen: Twelve P-Value Misconceptions" catalogued twelve common misinterpretations of the p-value and has been widely cited across multiple disciplines.

=== Research reproducibility ===
Goodman has been a leading figure in efforts to define and improve research reproducibility. In 2016, he co-authored a widely cited Science Translational Medicine paper with Daniele Fanelli and John Ioannidis that proposed a standardized conceptual framework distinguishing among "methods reproducibility," "results reproducibility," and "inferential reproducibility." In 2007, he and Sander Greenland published a critique of Ioannidis's influential claim that most published research findings are false, arguing that the conclusion rested on circular reasoning within its Bayesian framework.

He has also contributed to work on reproducible research practices in medical publishing.

=== Clinical research methods ===
Goodman has made contributions to the methods of clinical trials, comparative effectiveness research, and meta-analysis. He co-authored work on methodological standards for comparative effectiveness research with the PCORI, and published on the need for transformational change in randomized clinical trial design for comparative effectiveness. He also contributed to the development of methods for comparative effectiveness research more broadly.

His work on meta-analysis includes early contributions on the role of evidence in meta-analytic synthesis and later work addressing the problem of inconsistent effects in random-effects meta-analysis. He has also written on the concept of "metabias" as a challenge for comparative effectiveness research.

Additional contributions include work on practical improvements to the continual reassessment method for phase I studies, the misuse of statistical power in interpreting clinical trial results, Bayesian approaches to pediatric clinical trials, and the quality of peer review.

=== Research ethics and causal inference ===
Goodman has contributed to the ethics of clinical research, particularly in the context of learning healthcare systems. He co-authored work with Ruth Faden and Nancy Kass proposing an ethics framework that departs from the traditional research-treatment distinction, and contributed to discussions of ethical considerations in drug safety research. He has also co-authored work on causal inference in public health.

== Awards and honors ==
- Myrto Lefkopoulou Distinguished Lecturer, Harvard Department of Biostatistics (2000)
- Spinoza Chair in Medicine, University of Amsterdam (2016)
- Abraham Lilienfeld Award, American College of Epidemiology (2019)
- Elected to the National Academy of Medicine (2020)

== Selected publications ==
- Goodman, S. N., Royall, R. (1988). "Evidence and scientific research". American Journal of Public Health. 78 (12): 1568–1574. doi:10.2105/ajph.78.12.1568. PMC 1349737. PMID 3189634.
- Goodman, S. N. (2007). "Stopping at nothing? Some dilemmas of data monitoring in clinical trials". Annals of Internal Medicine. 146 (12): 882–887. doi:10.7326/0003-4819-146-12-200706190-00010. PMID 17577008. S2CID 21243453.
- Goodman, S. N. (2002). "The mammography dilemma: A crisis for evidence-based medicine?". Annals of Internal Medicine. 137 (5): 363–365. doi:10.7326/0003-4819-137-5_part_1-200209030-00015. PMID 12204023. S2CID 40784168.
- Goodman, S. (2011). "Confessions of a chagrined trialist". BMJ Quality & Safety. 20 (Suppl_1): i97–i98. doi:10.1136/bmjqs.2010.046623. PMC 3066790. PMID 21450783.
- Moher, D., Naudet, F., Cristea, I. A., Miedema, F., Ioannidis, J. P. A., Goodman, S. N. (2018). "Assessing scientists for hiring, promotion, and tenure". PLOS Biology. 16 (3) e2004089. doi:10.1371/journal.pbio.2004089. PMC 5875754. PMID 29596415.
