= Proteus phenomenon =

Phenomenon in scientific publishing

The Proteus phenomenon is the tendency in science for early replications of a work to contradict the original findings, a consequence of publication bias. It is akin to the winner's curse.

The term was coined by John Ioannidis and Thomas A. Trikalinos in 2005 named after the Greek god Proteus who could rapidly change his appearance. A 2013 paper argued that the phenomenon might be "desirable or even optimal" from a scientific standpoint.

== See also ==
- Reproducibility
- Reproducibility Project
- Metascience
