= Multiple treatments =

Design of experiments in statistics

Multiple treatments, like multivalued treatments, generalize the binary treatment effects framework. But rather than focusing on a treatment effect that can take on different values, the focus now is on different types of treatment. One example could be a job training program, where different types of job training are offered to the participants. The case of multiple treatments is relatively difficult to handle, as it can require additional functional form restrictions, especially when addressing the counterfactual or potential outcomes framework. Nevertheless, the general instrumental variable framework used to analyze binary treatment effects has been extended to allow for multiple treatments.

There are different approaches available to analyze multiple treatment effects. One can think of treatment effects within this framework as the difference in the counterfactual outcomes that would have been observed if the agent faced different general choice sets, with multinomial choices being a natural way to analyze multiple treatments. More formally, assume there are J options available and the value to the agent of choosing option j is

R_{j} (Z_{j} )=v_{j} (Z_{j} ) -ϵ_{j}

where ε_{j} is some unobserved random shock. Then the agent will choose alternative j such that R_{j} ≥ R_{k} for all k≠j. There is a potential outcome associated with each possible state, Y_{j} = μ_{j}(X_{j}, U_{j}), where X is a vector of observered characteristics and U is a vector of unobserved characteristics. The observed outcome is Y= $\sum_{j=0}^J$ D_{j} Y_{j} where D_{j} is an indicator that equals 1 when the treatment equals j and 0 when it does not equal j. The parameters of interest are the treatment effects Y_{j} - Y_{k} for pairs k and j.

Other frameworks focus less on the choice dynamics and consider a random coefficient setting for the different treatment options, or use dummy variables for the different possible treatments. For instance, when thinking about two possible treatments that are not mutually exclusive, four indicator variables can fully specify the different treatment options.

Some authors have suggested that when testing for multiple outcomes, one might want to adjust the p-values or significance levels when testing hypotheses. In a Bayesian setting, it has been argued that the problem of multiple treatments can be incorporated in multilevel models, which addresses the multiple comparisons problems while yielding more efficient estimates if the model specification is correct.
