= Novim =

Climatological research organizations

Novim is a non-profit group at the University of California, Santa Barbara that organizes teams for objective scientific study of global issues and identification options for addressing the concerns, based upon a collaborative problem-solving approach used in the field of physics.

== Overview ==
The group was formed at the University of California campus in Santa Barbara to create a collaborative problem-solving approach to address widespread and complicated problems, modeled after approaches at the Kavli Institute for Theoretical Physics (KITP). Novim organizes study teams of scientists, researchers, and area experts to evaluate issues like climate engineering, global surface temperatures, and methane leakages in natural gas production. Their criteria for issue selection is that it must be "highly complex, controversial and global." They partner with governmental organizations, like the Department of Energy and Office of Science, to engage them in the process, share findings and discuss potential actions.

Jim Knight is Novim's executive vice president and Michael Ditmore is its executive director, both of whom are Kavli Institute for Theoretical Physics (KITP) Director's Council members.

== Advisory board ==
- Aristides Patrinos, chief scientist, director of research and chair of the science advisory board, Novim
- Henry Abarbanel, research director science and security at IGCC
- Elbert Branscomb, Department of Physics, University of Illinois Biocomplexity research theme member, Institute for Genomic Biology
- Michelle Broido, associate vice chancellor for biomedical research, Office of Research, Health Sciences, University of Pittsburgh
- Juan Enriquez, managing director, Excel Venture Management, bestselling author, Co-Founder, Synthetic Genomics and multiple start-ups
- Jack Fellows, director emeritus, Climate Change Science Institute, Oak Ridge National Laboratory
- David J. Galas, principal scientist, Pacific Northwest Research Institute
- Steven E. Koonin, founding director of the NYU Center for Urban Science & Progress, Brooklyn, NY
- Greg Mitchell, professor emeritus, Integrative Oceanography Division, Scripps Institution of Oceanography, San Diego CA
- Venkatesh Narayanamurti, former dean, Harvard School of Engineering & Applied Science
- Edward Schulak, philanthropist, architect, entrepreneur, inventor, international business leader as well as the founder, financier and director of nine life science companies
- Gerry Stokes, research professor, Stony Brook University

== Projects ==
=== Geoengineering Study ===
They first studied the changes in the Earth's average surface temperature and published their findings in 2009 in the Climate Engineering Study Group report. (Note: The International Institute for Applied Systems Analysis (IIASA) announced Novim's first report in August 2009.) They found that there was a need to use geoengineering to lower the Earth's average temperature and suggested adopting the principles of short wave climate engineering (SWCE) to introduce aerosols into the stratosphere. Much like the sulfur particles released by large volcanic eruptions, the aerosols would reflect shortwave solar radiation back into space to cool the air and land below. Although SWCE may help reverse global warming, the technique remains untested and potential adverse effects are unknown, and therefore could not be mitigated. Opponents have stated that the core causes are not addressed, only the symptoms, and that SWCE would damage the ozone.

Novim collected an international team of scientists to work together on the study, which was performed on a small scale to make options available as soon as reasonably possible. (Note: Dr. Ken Caldeira advocates for small scale testing to be performed soon so that a working system could, at the very least, be designed and ready in event of a large-scale climate crisis which requires rapid global action.) They determined that the cost to deploying the methods described in the study would be about US$8 billion per year if delivered by aircraft. (Note: The paper was submitted to peer review in 2009 at the IOP Conference Series and the IIASA GGI Seminar. Novim has also made the paper available for free online at Arxiv.org. Since its release, Novim's Geoengineering Study has become a common reference in peer academic studies on the subject, including a United States House of Representatives Report, an article in Science, the Journal of Geophysical Research, and the International Seminar on Nuclear War and Planetary Emergencies. The study has also appeared on the suggested reading lists at the Trottier Symposium, the Denver Climate Study Group, and the International Risk Governance Council meeting on geoengineering.)

=== Berkeley Earth Surface Temperature (BEST) Study ===
Novim's second study was the Berkeley Earth Surface Temperature Study (BEST), released 29 July 2012. The study reanalyzes the world's land temperature data following the Climatic Research Unit email controversy. Professor Richard A. Muller led the study team that included 2011 Nobel Prize in Physics winner Saul Perlmutter. (Note: Results are available via the BEST website, as well as through the "Just Science" iOS app.)

=== Methane Leakage ===
Methane Leakage - Novim has assembled a team of scientific and technical experts to analyze existing studies of the emissions profile of natural gas during the production and distribution phases, with a focus on determining a range of actual methane leakage rates. Probable causes for the leakage will be included, and proposed solutions will be examined, along with associated costs.

== See also ==
- Global warming controversy
