= Journal of Evaluation in Clinical Practice =

- Discipline: Clinical practice, health care
- Language: English
- Edited by: Mathew Mercuri

Publication details
- History: 1995-present
- Publisher: Wiley-Blackwell
- Frequency: Quarterly
- Impact factor: 2.336 (2021)

Standard abbreviations
- ISO 4: J. Eval. Clin. Pract.

Indexing
- CODEN: JECPFJ
- ISSN: 1356-1294 (print); 1365-2753 (web)
- LCCN: 00242237
- OCLC no.: 857549413

Links
- Journal homepage; Online access; Online archive

The Journal of Evaluation in Clinical Practice is a quarterly peer-reviewed medical journal covering the evaluation of clinical practice in all medical and health disciplines. It was established in 1995 and is published by Wiley-Blackwell. The editor-in-chief is Mathew Mercuri ([University of Toronto]). According to the Journal Citation Reports, the journal has a 2015 impact factor of 1.053, ranking it 15th out of 20 journals in the category "Medical informatics".
