= European Journal of Clinical Investigation =

- Discipline: Biomedicine
- Language: English
- Edited by: Fabrizio Montecucco

Publication details
- Former name: Archiv für klinische Medizin
- History: 1970–present
- Publisher: John Wiley & Sons
- Frequency: Monthly
- Impact factor: 4.686 (2021)

Standard abbreviations
- ISO 4: Eur. J. Clin. Investig.
- NLM: Eur J Clin Invest

Indexing
- CODEN: EJCIB8
- ISSN: 0014-2972 (print); 1365-2362 (web)
- LCCN: 75646840
- OCLC no.: 884607978

Links
- Journal homepage; Online access; Online archive

The European Journal of Clinical Investigation is a monthly peer-reviewed medical journal and the official publication of the European Society for Clinical Investigation. The journal covers all aspects of biomedical research, combining clinical and translational research. It was established in 1970 as the continuation of Archiv für Klinische Medizin, and is published by John Wiley & Sons. The editor-in-chief is Prof. Fabrizio Montecucco (University of Genoa). According to the Journal Citation Reports, the journal has a 2024 impact factor of 3.6, ranking Q1 in the category "Medicine, General & Internal" and Q2 in the category "Medicine, Research & Experimental".
