= Irene J. Virgolini =

Austrian physician and professor of nuclear medicine

- Born: December 29, 1962 (age 63); Klagenfurt, Carinthia, Austria

Academic work
- Discipline: Nuclear medicine
- Institutions: Medical University of Innsbruck

Irene Johanna Virgolini (born December 29, 1962) is an Austrian nuclear medicine physician, professor, and director of the University Clinic for Nuclear Medicine at the Medical University of Innsbruck.

== Life ==
Virgolini studied medicine at the University of Vienna from 1981 to 1987. She first gained interest in medical research at the Institute of Human Genetics at the University of Vienna. This was further deepend during a study visit to the Sackler Medical School at Hasharon Hospital, Tel Aviv University in Israel. She subsequently began her research career in 1985, focusing on atherosclerosis research at the Institute of Physiology at the University of Vienna. Parallel to her research activities, she began training in internal medicine with a specialization in nuclear medicine at the University Hospital Vienna in 1987, where she initially served as an assistant physician and later, until 2000, as a senior physician.

Virgolini was appointed university lecturer in experimental nuclear medicine in 1992 for her work on functional liver scintigraphy. In 1995, she was appointed university lecturer in internal medicine for her work on oncological receptor scintigraphy. This was followed by the establishment of a working group for experimental nuclear medicine at the University of Vienna. In 2000, Virgolini took over as head of the Institute for Nuclear Medicine at Lainz Hospital in Vienna. In 2003, she was appointed full professor and director of the University Clinic for Nuclear Medicine at the Medical University of Innsbruck. Since then, the University Clinic for Nuclear Medicine has continued to expand in the areas of clinical practice, research, and teaching.

Following her appointment, Virgolini served as a university council member for the Medical University of Vienna from 2018 to 2023.

Since 2016, Virgolini has been active with the World Association of Radiopharmaceutical and Molecular Therapy (WARMTH), whose goal is the global promotion of molecular radionuclide therapy. She served as president of the organization from 2019 to 2020.

== Research ==
=== Scientific focus ===
Virgolini's clinical research focuses on the development and preclinical validation of new radiopharmaceuticals for nuclear medicine diagnostics and therapy. Under Virgolini's leadership, several new nuclear medicine Tracer-Procedures (Positron-Emissions-Tomography - PET and SPECT) have been clinically established. Her clinical research focuses on the field of neuroendocrine tumor diseases and the nuclear medicine treatment of prostate cancer. Moreover, her research also focuses on patient-related quality of life in the context of individualized high-dose therapy.

=== Publications and lectures ===
Virgolini's scientific work has appeared in over 500 publications in medical journals (1990–2024: total impact factor 1000, citation index 10000, Hirsch-Index 50, based on "Web of Science"). Since 1988, Virgolini has been invited to international conferences and universities and faculties in Austria and abroad to give lectures on the subject of "Molecular Imaging and Therapy".

=== Selected publications ===
- Santo G, di Santo G, Cicone F, Virgolini I (2025). "Peptide receptor radionuclide therapy with somatostatin analogs beyond gastroenteropancreatic neuroendocrine tumors". Journal of Neuroendocrinology. 37 (3) e70013. doi:10.1111/jne.70013. PMC 11919479. PMID 40064181.
- Pascual TN, Paez D, Iagaru A, Gnanasegaran G, Lee ST, Sathekge M, et al. (July 2024). "Guiding principles on the education and practice of theranostics". European Journal of Nuclear Medicine and Molecular Imaging. 51 (8): 2320–2331. doi:10.1007/s00259-024-06657-2. PMC 11178594. PMID 38453729.
- Sviridenko A, Boehm A, di Santo G, Uprimny C, Nilica B, Fritz J, et al. (December 2022). "Enhancing clinical diagnosis for patients with persistent pulmonary abnormalities after COVID-19 infection: the potential benefit of [68Ga]Ga-FAPI PET/CT". Clinical Nuclear Medicine. 47 (12): 1026–1029. doi:10.1097/RLU.0000000000004437. PMC 9653058. PMID 36257062.
- Virgolini I (2022). "Theragnostics in Austria". In Jekunen A (ed.). The Evolution of Radionanotargeting towards Clinical Precision Oncology: A Festschrift in Honor of Kalevi Kairemo. BSP. pp. 232–245. doi:10.2174/9781681088655122010021. ISBN 978-1-68108-865-5.
- Virgolini I, Decristoforo C, Haug A, Fanti S, Uprimny C (March 2018). "Current status of theranostics in prostate cancer". European Journal of Nuclear Medicine and Molecular Imaging. 45 (3): 471–495. doi:10.1007/s00259-017-3882-2. PMC 5787224. PMID 29282518.
- Virgolini I (April–June 2018). "Greetings from the New President of the World Association of Radiopharmaceutical and Molecular Therapy". World J Nucl Med. 17 (2): 67–69. doi:10.4103/wjnm.WJNM_27_18. PMC 5905260. PMID 29719479.
- Bozkurt MF, Virgolini I, Balogova S, Beheshti M, Rubello D, Decristoforo C, et al. (August 2017). "Guideline for PET/CT imaging of neuroendocrine neoplasms with 68Ga-DOTA-conjugated somatostatin receptor targeting peptides and 18F-DOPA". European Journal of Nuclear Medicine and Molecular Imaging. 44 (9): 1588–1601. doi:10.1007/s00259-017-3728-y. hdl:11655/15778. PMID 28547177.
- Scarpa L, Buxbaum S, Kendler D, Fink K, Bektic J, Gruber L, et al. (January 12, 2017). "The 68Ga/177Lu theragnostic concept in PSMA targeting of castration-resistant prostate cancer: correlation of SUVmax values and absorbed dose estimates". European Journal of Nuclear Medicine and Molecular Imaging. 44 (5): 788–800. doi:10.1007/s00259-016-3609-9. PMID 28083690.
- Uprimny C, Kroiss AS, Decristoforo C, Fritz J, von Guggenberg E, Kendler D, et al. (January 31, 2017). "68Ga-PSMA-11 PET/CT in primary staging of prostate cancer: PSA and Gleason score predict the intensity of tracer accumulation in the primary tumour". European Journal of Nuclear Medicine and Molecular Imaging. 44 (6): 941–949. doi:10.1007/s00259-017-3631-6. PMID 28138747.
- Uprimny C, Kroiss AS, Decristoforo C, Fritz J, Warwitz B, Scarpa L, et al. (November 29, 2016). "Early dynamic imaging in 68Ga-PSMA-11 PET/CT allows discrimination of urinary bladder activity and prostate cancer lesions". European Journal of Nuclear Medicine and Molecular Imaging.
- Virgolini I, Gabriel M, Kroiss A, von Guggenberg E, Prommegger R, Warwitz B, et al. (October 2016). "Current knowledge on the sensitivity of the (68)Ga-somatostatin receptor positron emission tomography and the SUVmax reference range for management of pancreatic neuroendocrine tumours". European Journal of Nuclear Medicine and Molecular Imaging. 43 (11): 2072–2083. doi:10.1007/s00259-016-3395-4. PMC 5007271. PMID 27174220.

In 1997, Virgolini was granted a patent for a carrier substance for radionuclides for the diagnosis and destruction of tumor tissue (Vienna Patent Office), and in 1998 an EU patent for radiolabeled somatostatin receptor ligands for diagnosis and therapy.

=== Awards ===
Some of the approximately 30 national and international prizes and awards that Virgolini has received for her scientific work:

- 1992: Award of the International Union of Angiology, Paris
- 1992 und 1994: Jean Debiesse Award der European Association of Nuclear Medicine (EANM), Lissabon/Düsseldorf
- 1996: Martin-Gülzow Award der Deutschen Gesellschaft für Verdauungs- und Stoffwechselkrankheiten, Aachen
- 1996 und 2008: Editorial Board Award of the Journal of Nuclear Medicine, Denver/New Orleans
- 1997: Mac Foster Award der European Society of Clinical Investigation
- 2008 und 2010: Alavi-Mandell Award der Society of Nuclear Medicine (SNM), New Orleans/Salt Lake City
- 2012: EANM-Springer-Preis Best Basic Science Paper 2011, Mailand.
- 2018: Unter Federführung von Christian Uprimny: 1. Rudolf-Höfer-Preis, Innsbruck
- 2018: EANM-Springer-Preis Best Paper 2018, Düsseldorf.
- 2019: Preis der Ärztekammer für Tirol 2018, Innsbruck.
- 2020: Ilse-Zoller-Förderungspreis für Naturwissenschaften, Zell am See.
- 2024: Österreichischer Schilddrüsenpreis 2024, Innsbruck.

== Literature ==
- "The 50th Anniversary of Nuclear Medicine in Innsbruck". European Journal of Nuclear Medicine and Molecular Imaging. 38 (11): 2106. November 2011. doi:10.1007/s00259-011-1897-7.
- Nuclear Medicine Innsbruck celebrates its 50th anniversary. In: Glandula. Journal of the Neuroendocrine Tumors Network (NeT). 16, 2011, p. 20.
