= PLOS Medicine =

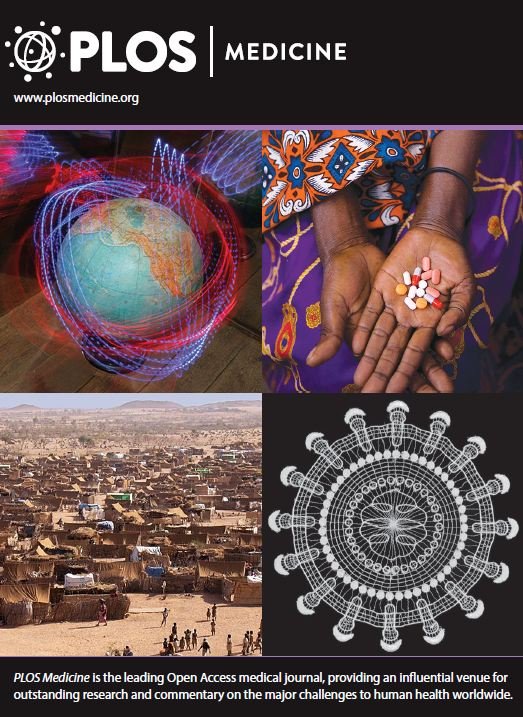
- Discipline: Medicine
- Language: English
- Edited by: Helen Lumbard

Publication details
- History: 2004–present
- Publisher: Public Library of Science
- Frequency: Weekly
- Open access: Yes
- License: Creative Commons Attribution License
- Impact factor: 9.9 (2024)

Standard abbreviations
- ISO 4: PLOS Med.

Indexing
- ISSN: 1549-1277 (print); 1549-1676 (web)
- LCCN: 2004212194
- OCLC no.: 54674092

Links
- Journal homepage; Online access; Online archive

PLOS Medicine (formerly styled PLoS Medicine) is a peer-reviewed weekly medical journal covering the full spectrum of the medical sciences. It began operation on October 19, 2004, as the second journal of the Public Library of Science (PLOS), a non-profit open access publisher. All content in PLOS Medicine is published under the Creative Commons "by-attribution" license. To fund the journal, the publication's business model requires in most cases that authors pay publication fees. The journal was published online and in a printed format until 2005 and is now only published online. The journal's acting chief editor is Clare Stone, who replaced the previous chief editor, Larry Peiperl, in 2018.

== Aims and scope ==
The journal's initial aim was to provide an open-access alternative to existing top-tier journals such as The New England Journal of Medicine and The Lancet and has concentrated on publishing papers on diseases that take the greatest toll on health globally. In 2009 the journal reaffirmed its scope and noted that it would use an evidence-based approach to give highest priority to studies on diseases and risk factors that cause the greatest burden worldwide.

From the outset the journal noted that it would not be part of "the cycle of dependency that has formed between journals and the pharmaceutical industry". The journal does not publish advertisements for pharmaceutical products or medical devices and the journal's open-access license means that it cannot benefit from exclusive reprint sales.

== Abstracting and indexing ==
The journal is abstracted and indexed in Index Medicus/MEDLINE/PubMed, the Science Citation Index Expanded, Current Contents/Clinical Medicine, and BIOSIS Previews. According to the Journal Citation Reports, the journal had a 2014 impact factor of 14.429, ranking it 7th out of 153 journals in the category "Medicine, General & Internal".

== Notable articles ==
=== Why Most Published Research Findings Are False (2005) ===
In 2005 PLOS Medicine published an essay by John P. A. Ioannidis entitled "Why Most Published Research Findings Are False". The essay used a simulation approach to demonstrate that for most study designs and settings it is more likely for a research claim to be false than true due to inherent biases in the way that modern science is conducted. This paper has met much approval, though Goodman and Greenland criticized it in a short comment and a longer analysis. Ioannidis has answered this critique. A profile of Ioannidis' work including a discussion of his 2005 paper appeared in the November 2010 issue of The Atlantic.

=== Male Circumcision for Reduction of HIV Infection Risk (2005) ===
The first randomized controlled trial to assess the effect of male circumcision on female to male HIV transmission was published in 2005 by Bertran Auvert and colleagues in PLOS Medicine. The Lancet a leading medical journal rejected this paper because of ethical concerns around how the trial was conducted before PLOS Medicine accepted it. The trial was stopped early by the Data and Safety Monitoring Board who advised the investigators to interrupt the trial and offer circumcision to the control group. The trial estimated that male circumcision protected 60% (95% CI: 32%–76%) for female-to-male HIV transmission.

The results of this trial along with two others led to the World Health Organization (WHO) assessing the evidence for male circumcision to prevent HIV transmission. The WHO and UNAIDS subsequently issued recommendations concerning male circumcision and HIV/AIDS including suggestions for government strategic plans, advocacy challenges and exploring the role of new technologies for voluntary medical male circumcision (VMMC) such as Prepex and other medical devices. Several Ministries of Health along with key stakeholders have committed to scaling up VMMC for HIV prevention in Southern and Eastern Africa.

=== Wyeth Ghostwriting Scandal (2009/2010) ===
In July 2009, a United States federal court decision resulted in the release of approximately 1500 documents detailing how articles highlighting specific marketing messages written by unattributed writers, but "authored" by academics, are strategically placed in the medical literature – a practice known as ghostwriting. To release these documents, PLOS Medicine, represented by the public interest law firm Public Justice, and The New York Times, acted as "intervenors" in litigation against menopausal hormone manufacturers by women who developed breast cancer while taking hormones. PLOS Medicine argued that sealed documents identified during the discovery process for the court case, which demonstrated the practice of ghostwriting, should be made available to the public.

The documents were initially made publicly available on the PLOS Medicine website but they are now available as part of the Drug Industry Documents Archive at the University of California, San Francisco. In 2010 PLOS Medicine published the first academic analysis of the documents by Adriane Fugh-Berman. Her article revealed that the pharmaceutical company Wyeth used ghostwritten articles to mitigate the perceived risks of breast cancer associated with menopausal hormone therapy (HT), to defend the unsupported cardiovascular "benefits" of HT, and to promote off-label, unproven uses of HT such as the prevention of dementia, Parkinson's disease, vision problems, and wrinkles. The article was subsequently covered by The Guardian.

=== Tamiflu clinical trial data sharing (2012) ===
In April 2012 PLOS Medicine published an article by three researchers who were involved in ongoing updates of a Cochrane Collaboration review of neuraminidase inhibitors for treating influenza, describing their experience of trying to gain access to clinical study reports for the antiviral Tamiflu (oseltamivir) from the drug's manufacturer Roche. The article outlined the need for access to all clinical trial data held by pharmaceutical companies and regulators, and detailed reasons given by Roche for not sharing data on Tamiflu.

In a commissioned perspective article published in the same issue of PLOS Medicine, regulators from the European Medicines Agency (EMA) and other national regulatory bodies outlined a shift in their stance on access to clinical trial data but also highlighted challenges that would need to be overcome. The regulators noted, "[w]e consider it neither desirable nor realistic to maintain the status quo of limited availability of regulatory trials data" and concluded, "[w]e welcome debate on these issues, and remain confident that satisfactory solutions can be found to make complete trial data available in a way that will be in the best interest of public health".

The article marked a move towards the proactive disclosure of clinical trial data and led to the EMA holding a workshop to establish how this could be done. At the workshop Guido Rasi, the EMA's Executive Director, announced "[t]oday represents the first step in delivering our vision. We are not here to decide if we will publish clinical-trial data, only how. We need to do this to rebuild trust and confidence in the whole system". PLOS Medicine's chief editor, Virginia Barbour, was an invited speaker at the workshop representing the media.
