= Luca Scorrano =

Italian biologist

- Born: September 6, 1971 (age 54); Italy
- Citizenship: Italian
- Education: University of Padova
- Scientific career
- Workplaces: University of Padova Veneto Institute of Molecular Medicine University of Geneva
- Academic advisors: Stanley J. Korsmeyer

Luca Scorrano (born September 6, 1971) is an Italian biologist and professor of Biochemistry at the University of Padua as well as the former Scientific Director of the Veneto Institute of Molecular Medicine in Italy. He is known for his important contributions to the field of mitochondrial dynamics and the interface between mitochondria and the endoplasmic reticulum.

== Biography and research ==
Scorrano obtained his M.D. and Ph.D. from the University of Padua Medical School in 1996 and 2001, respectively. He then moved to Boston where he worked with Stanley J. Korsmeyer at Harvard Medical School. It is during his postdoctoral work in Korsmeyer's lab that Luca became passionate about mitochondrial dynamics and discovered that mitochondrial cristae remodeling was involved in cytochrome c release and apoptosis. In 2003 he returned to Italy to establish his lab at the University of Padua, and then in Geneva (Switzerland) where he was Professor at the Dept. of Cell Physiology and Metabolism. In 2013 he returned to his native Italy where he continued to unravel the molecular mechanisms of mitochondrial dynamics and their pathophysiological consequences.

He has been prolific in his contributions to the fields of apoptosis and mitochondrial pathophysiology, as well as mitochondrial dynamics and interorganellar contact sites. His lab identified the role of Opa1, optic atrophy protein 1, in holding mitochondrial cristae junctions tight, which is an important determinant of mitochondrial respiratory efficiency. His lab also found augmentation of Opa1 to correct mitochondrial diseases and blunt muscular atrophy, stroke and heart ischemia. In 2008, Scorrano's lab identified Mfn2, a protein mutated in a peripheral neuropathy, as the first molecular bridge between endoplasmic reticulum and mitochondria. His notable work contributed to the current understanding of how mitochondrial shape and structure influence cellular processes and cellular homeostasis.

His lab is now focused on understanding the molecular mechanisms and pathophysiological consequences of mitochondrial dynamics and contacts with the ER in health and disease.

== Awards ==
Scorrano received several prizes and awards, including the Eppendorf European Young Investigator, the Chiara D’Onofrio and the ESCI Award. He is an EMBO Member and sits in several Committees, Advisory and Editorial Boards.
