= Multivalued treatment =

Design of experiments in statistics

In statistics, in particular in the design of experiments, a multi-valued treatment is a treatment that can take on more than two values. It is related to the dose-response model in the medical literature.

== Description ==
Generally speaking, treatment levels may be finite or infinite as well as ordinal or cardinal, which leads to a large collection of possible treatment effects to be studied in applications. One example is the effect of different levels of program participation (e.g. full-time and part-time) in a job training program.

Assume there exists a finite collection of multi-valued treatment status $T=\{0,1,2,\ldots,J,\}$ with J some fixed integer. As in the potential outcomes framework, denote $Y (j) \subset R$ the collection of potential outcomes under the treatment J, and $Y=\textstyle \sum_{j=0}^J \displaystyle D_j Y(j)$ denotes the observed outcome and $D_{j}$ is an indicator that equals 1 when the treatment equals j and 0 when it does not equal j, leading to a fundamental problem of causal inference. A general framework that analyzes ordered choice models in terms of marginal treatment effects and average treatment effects has been extensively discussed by Heckman and Vytlacil.

Recent work in the econometrics and statistics literature has focused on estimation and inference for multivalued treatments and ignorability conditions for identifying the treatment effects. In the context of program evaluation, the propensity score has been generalized to allow for multi-valued treatments, while other work has also focused on the role of the conditional mean independence assumption. Other recent work has focused more on the large sample properties of an estimator of the marginal mean treatment effect conditional on a treatment level in the context of a difference-in-differences model, and on the efficient estimation of multi-valued treatment effects in a semiparametric framework.
