= Journal of Translational Medicine =

- Discipline: Translational medicine
- Language: English
- Edited by: Francesco Marincola

Publication details
- History: 2003-present
- Publisher: BioMed Central
- Open access: Yes
- License: Creative Commons Attribution
- Impact factor: 8.440 (2021)

Standard abbreviations
- ISO 4: J. Transl. Med.

Indexing
- CODEN: JTMOBV
- ISSN: 1479-5876
- OCLC no.: 52767881

Links
- Journal homepage; Online archive

The Journal of Translational Medicine is a peer-reviewed open-access medical journal published by BioMed Central since 2003. The editor-in-chief is Francesco Marincola. According to the Journal Citation Reports, the journal had a 2021 impact factor of 8.440.
