= Science Translational Medicine =

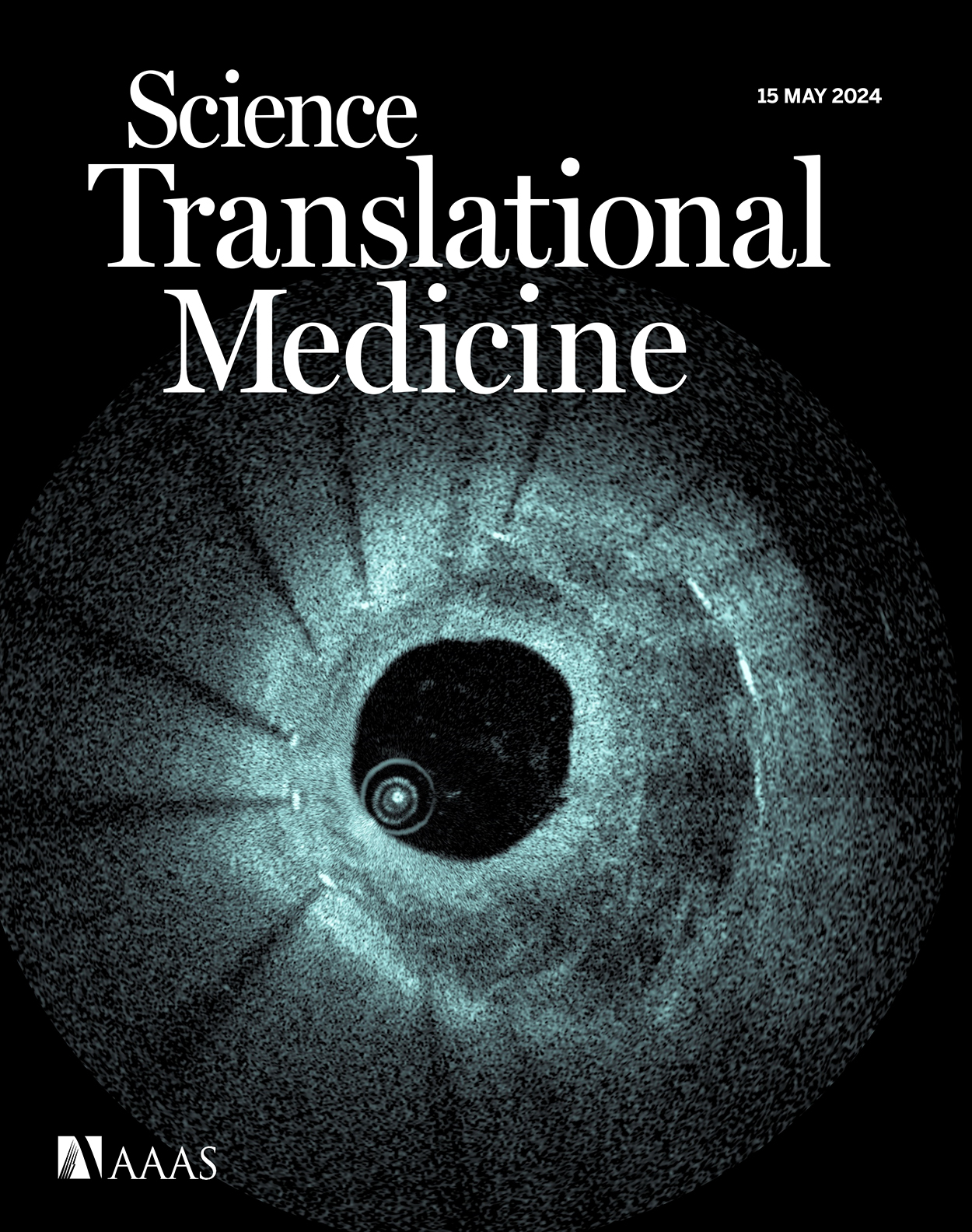
- Discipline: Translational medicine
- Language: English

Publication details
- History: 2009–present
- Publisher: American Association for the Advancement of Science (United States)
- Frequency: Weekly
- Impact factor: 14.6 (2024)

Standard abbreviations
- ISO 4: Sci. Transl. Med.

Indexing
- ISSN: 1946-6234 (print); 1946-6242 (web)

Links
- Journal homepage; Online access; Online archive

Science Translational Medicine is a weekly peer-reviewed medical journal established in October 2009 by the American Association for the Advancement of Science. It publishes basic, biomedical, translational, and clinical research about human diseases. According to the Journal Citation Reports, the journal has a 2024 impact factor of 14.6.

The journal has published articles covering novel tools and technologies that aid in investigating the fundamental mechanisms underlying health and disease, as well as the variability of drug responses in humans, precision medicine, and regulatory science.

== Abstracting and indexing ==
The journal is abstracted and indexed by the major services with a focus on medicine and biology, including Science Citation Index & Web of Science, Index Medicus/MEDLINE/PubMed, and Scopus

== Associated journals ==
- Science
