= Josef Smolen =

Austrian rheumatologist and immunologist (born 1950)

Josef Sebastian Smolen (born March 24, 1950) is an Austrian rheumatologist and immunologist and professor emeritus at the Medical University of Vienna. Since 2018, he is chairman emeritus of the Department of Internal Medicine 3 and the Division of Rheumatology at the Medical University of Vienna and Vienna General Hospital and was the chairman of the 2nd Medical Department and Center for Diagnosis and Therapy of Rheumatic Diseases at the Lainz Hospital, now the Hietzing Clinic of the Vienna Health Association from 1989 to 2017.

== Biography ==
Smolen graduated from the Bundesrealgymnasium I Stubenbastei in 1968 and then studied medicine at the University of Vienna, where he obtained his doctorate in January 1975. From March 1975 to August 1976, he conducted research at the Institute of Immunology at the University of Vienna, and from September 1976 he was a resident at the 2nd Department of Medicine, University of Vienna, where he completed his training in internal medicine and rheumatology. From 1980–1981, he was a research fellow at the National Institute of Arthritis, Diabetes and Digestive and Kidney Diseases (NIADDK, now NIAMS) of the National Institutes of Health in Bethesda, MD, USA, with Alfred D. Steinberg. He became a senior physician with a leading function at the department's rheumatology unit in 1983.

His habilitation in clinical immunology in 1985 was followed by his habilitation in internal medicine in 1987. In 1989, he was appointed head of the 2nd Medical Department of the Lainz Hospital of the City of Vienna (Center for Diagnostics and Therapy of Rheumatic Diseases), a position he held until the end of 2017.

In 1995, he was appointed Professor of Internal Medicine and Head of the Division of Rheumatology at the Department of Medicine 3 of the University of Vienna (later Medical University of Vienna) and Vienna General Hospital and from 2007 also served as Head of the Department of Internal Medicine 3, a position he held until his retirement at the end of September 2018.

Smolen was President of the European League Against Rheumatism (EULAR) from 2003 to 2005. From 1998 to 2001, he was Treasurer of the International Union of Immunological Societies (IUIS). From 2006 to 2008, he was President of the Austrian Society for Allergology and Immunology (ÖGAI) and from 2004 to 2006 President of the Austrian Society for Rheumatology and Rehabilitation (ÖGR).

In 2003, Smolen was elected a corresponding member of the Austrian Academy of Sciences (ÖAW) and in 2005 a full member. In 2007, he was elected a member of the German Academy of Sciences Leopoldina – National Academy of Sciences. Since 2017, Smolen has been Editor-in-Chief of the scientific journal Annals of the Rheumatic Diseases – The EULAR Journal, which had an impact factor of over 27 in 2022. Since 2003, he has been one of the authors of the textbook "Rheumatology". Together with Kurt Redlich and Daniel Aletaha, he is the founder of the German-languaged scientific journal "Fakten der Rheumatologie" published by MedMedia Verlag.

Smolen is married to psychoanalyst Alicja Smolen, née Winter; together they have three children.

== Research ==
Smolen has published more than 700 scientific papers, including in the New England Journal of Medicine, The Lancet, JAMA, Nature Medicine, Annals of the Rheumatic Diseases and Journal of Clinical Investigation, on topics relating to immunology and rheumatology, with his research activities focusing on the pathogenesis and treatment of rheumatic diseases. In this context, together with his many colleagues, he has gained new insights into the development and propagation of joint destruction and helped to develop new therapies for rheumatoid arthritis and other inflammatory rheumatic diseases. The innovative therapies whose development he has significantly influenced include biologics such as monoclonal antibodies against TNF (infliximab, golimumab, certolizumab) or the IL-6 receptor (tocilizumab) as well as Janus kinase inhibitors (baricitinib, upadacitinib). Previously, he made significant contributions to the understanding of other then new drugs, such as leflunomide. Most recently, he was involved in the development of an antibody against IL-6 (olokizumab).

Smolen and his team have developed new disease activity scores for rheumatoid arthritis (Simplified Disease Activity Index, SDAI, and Clinical Disease Activity Index, CDAI), psoriatic arthritis (Disease Activity index for PSoriatic Arthritis, DAPSA) and reactive arthritis (Disease Activity index for REactive Arthritis, DAREA), which are used worldwide. He was also spiritus rector in the development and expansion of the treat-to-target concept (targeted therapy) for rheumatic diseases.

In the course of studies on autologous mixed lymphocyte culture, Smolen, together with Thomas Luger and others, showed for the first time that CD8 lymphocytes produce interleukin-2, a finding that broke through a dogma at the time. Together with Günter Steiner and others, he discovered a new autoantigen, RA-33, which triggers an autoimmune response, particularly in rheumatoid arthritis. To optimize the treatment of patients with rheumatoid arthritis, Smolen established immediate access early arthritis outpatient clinics at the Hietzing Hospital and the General Hospital herewith developed a concept to reduce waiting times for patients, which has enabled many rheumatoid arthritis patients to receive rapid and efficient help.

He is the author of a series of EULAR recommendations on the treatment of several rheumatic diseases. Since almost two decades he is one of the editors of the Textbook "Rheumatology", whose 8th edition has been published recently. Smolen has been one of the Highly Cited Researchers for many years and is a much sought-after speaker and teacher at international and national congresses and other events.

== Honors ==
- 2007 Carol Nachman Prize
- 2007 Golden Key of the City of Cuenca
- 2008 Fellow of the Royal Society of Medicine
- 2009 Decoration of Honor in Gold for services to the State of Vienna
- 2010 Doctor honoris causa of the University of Lund (Sweden)
- 2014 Doctor honoris causa of the University of Leiden (Netherlands)
- 2015 Master of the American College of Rheumatology
- 2017 Doctor honoris causa from Semmelweis University Budapest (Hungary)
- 2018 Awarded the Golden Town Hall Man by the Mayor of the City of Vienna
- 2020 Prize of the City of Vienna for Medical Sciences
- Honorary memberships of the Italian, Polish (2011), Slovak, Slovenian and German (2019) Societies of Rheumatology and EULAR

== Activities in literary studies ==
In addition to medical research, Smolen is also active in the field of literature, with a focus on literary expressionism. In this regard, he has written four bibliographies, namely one on the series "Der jüngste Tag" by Kurt Wolff Verlag (2nd edition 2013 by Burg-Verlag, Vienna), one on the series "Der rote Hahn" by Aktionsverlag (2019), one on the series "Das neuste Gedicht" by Dresdner Verlag of 1917 (2020) and another one on "Lyrische Flugblätter des Alfred Richard Meyer Verlags" (2021), all published by Rotes Antiquariat, Vienna-Berlin.

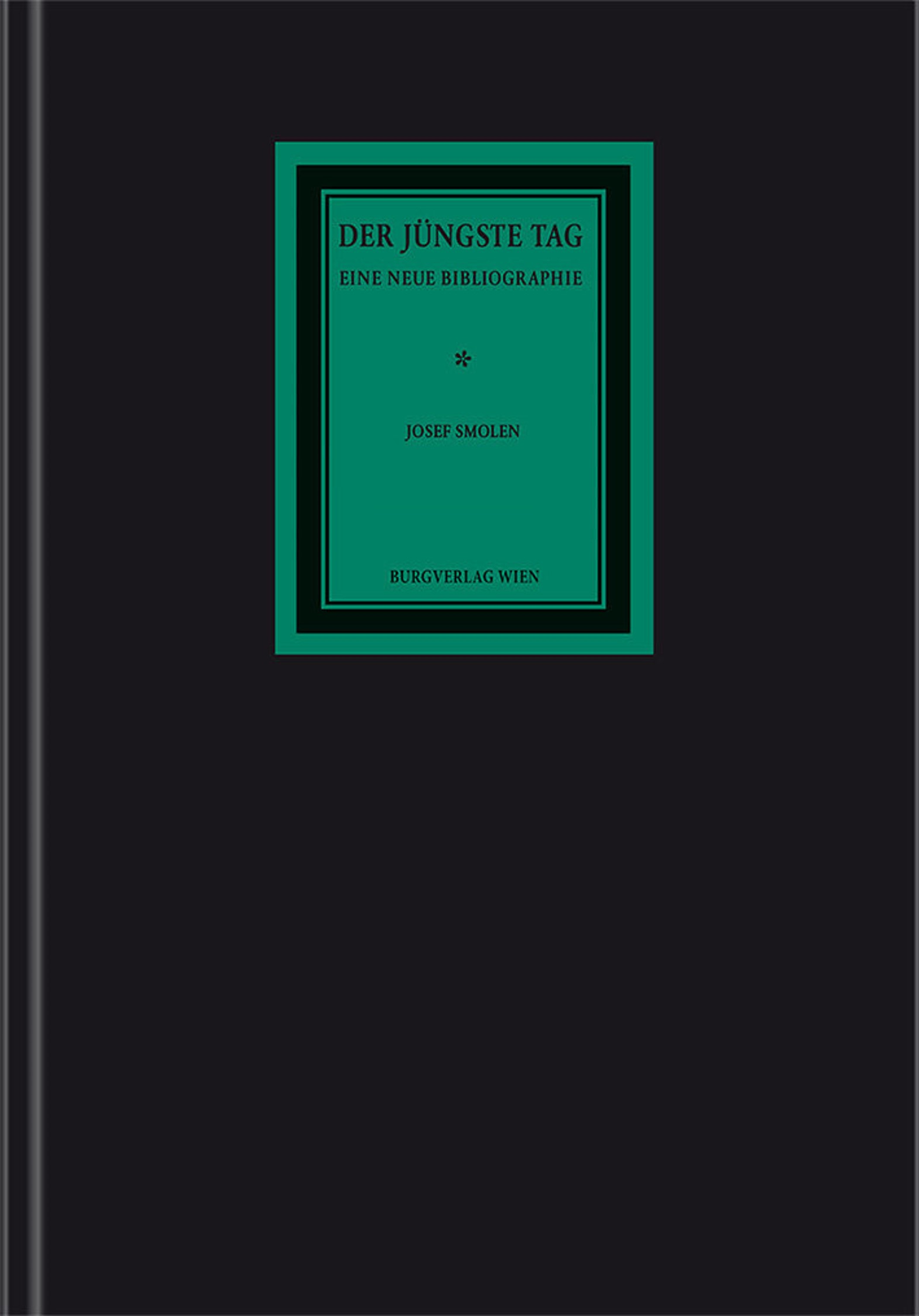

Most recently, a work focusing on Vienna at the turn of the century was published: "Fritzi Löw und die Buchkunst in Wien um 1900 – Neuentdeckes zu Kunstschaffenden und Verlagen", covering book-art in Vienna at the beginning of the 20th century, and was presented at the Museum of Applied Arts in Vienna in 2023.

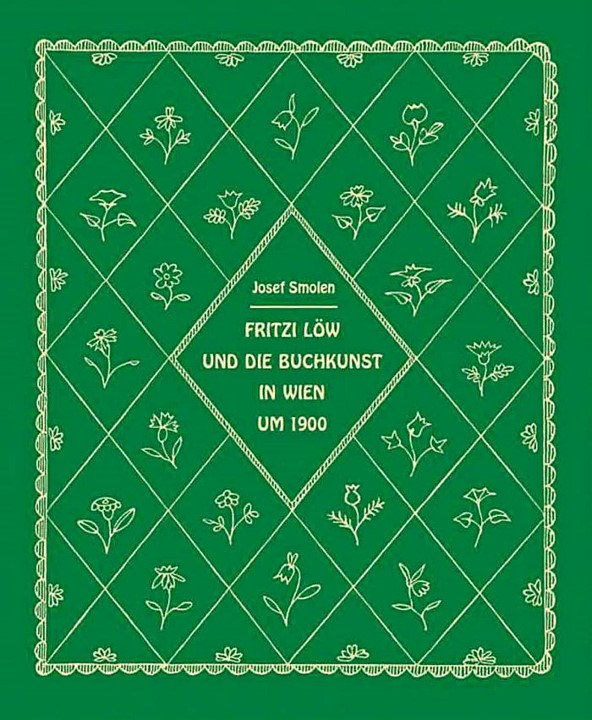
