= Iain McInnes =

British rheumatologist (born 1964)

Iain McInnes CBE FRCPE FRCPGlas FMedSci FRSE
- Born: 19 October 1964 (age 61); Glasgow, Scotland
- Education: University of Glasgow (BSc, MB ChB, PhD)
- Known for: Director of the Versus Arthritis Centre of Excellence for Inflammatory Arthritis
- Awards: FRCPE; FRCPGlas; FRSE (2008); FMedSci (2012); CBE (2019)
- Scientific career
- Fields: Rheumatology
- Institutions: University of Glasgow
- Thesis: Cytokine and nitric oxide production in inflammatory arthritis (1996)
- Doctoral advisor: Prof. F.Y. Liew and Prof. Roger D. Sturrock
- Website: www.gla.ac.uk/schools/infectionimmunity/staff/iainmcinnes/

Iain Blair McInnes FRCPE FRCPGlas FMedSci FRSE (born 19 October 1964) is a Scottish rheumatologist, Vice Principal and Head of the College of Medical, Veterinary and Life Sciences, Muirhead Chair of Medicine and Versus Arthritis Professor of Rheumatology at the University of Glasgow. His research has focused on inflammatory diseases, particularly rheumatoid arthritis and psoriatic arthritis.

His work has focused on new approaches and treatments for inflammatory diseases. Over two decades, he has been involved in clinical trials and pathogenesis investigation programs in inflammatory arthritis at an international level. His research has also explored the biology of inflammatory cytokines in arthritis and other inflammatory diseases, as well as the mechanisms of co-morbidities in chronic diseases.

== Research ==
McInnes's research has investigated the role of cytokines and their inflammation amplification role in immune-mediated inflammatory disease (IMID) pathogenesis. His early work focused on defining the roles played by novel cytokines in driving synovitis, including the effector functions of IL-15, IL-18, and IL-33 in rheumatoid (RA) and psoriatic arthritis (PsA) synovitis. His studies also examined the cytokine-driven cellular interactions between T cells, macrophages, and synovial fibroblasts, particularly the role of non-antigen dependent amplification of synovial inflammation.

Subsequently, his research identified several novel synovial cytokine amplificatory pathways involved in disease chronicity, such as PAR-2 dependent matrix enzyme sensing, and autoantibody to MICL-mediated monocyte activation. These studies have contributed to the understanding of the cellular and molecular mechanisms underlying inflammatory synovial disease.

== Roles ==
Currently Vice Principal and Head of the College of Medical, Veterinary and Life Sciences, Muirhead Chair of Medicine and Versus Arthritis Professor of Rheumatology at the University of Glasgow, he was past Chairman of the FOREUM (Foundation for European Rheumatology Research) Scientific Committee. From 2019 to 2021, he was President of EULAR, the leading transnational society for rheumatology across Europe, during which time he founded the European Rheumatology Research Centre, and established pan-European COVID-19 registries to define SARS-CoV-2 risk and vaccine efficacy across IMIDs. He chaired the UK Government's Independent Advisory Group for strategies to support immune vulnerable patient groups during the COVID-19 pandemic.

He is Director of the Versus Arthritis Centre of Excellence for Inflammatory Arthritis, led from Glasgow and including Universities of Oxford, Newcastle, and Birmingham. He was Chief Investigator of the IMID-Bio-UK meta-consortium leading the UK effort to discover precision medicine tractable biomarkers for application in immune diseases.

He is Associate Editor of Annals of the Rheumatic Diseases and Editor in Chief of Firestein & Kelley's Textbook of Rheumatology.

== Boards and committees ==
- Chairperson of the NIHR Biorepository Governance Oversight Board (2021 - present)
- MRC Experimental Medicine Board (Deputy Chair) (2020–2024)
- Versus Arthritis Trustee (2021–present)
- NHS Greater Glasgow & Clyde Health Board Member (2021–present)
- Past-President of European Alliance of Rheumatology Associations (EULAR) (2019–2021)
- Board member, Foreum Research Foundation (2023 – present)
- Member of Lister Prize Committee (2021–present)

== Awards and honours ==
McInnes was made of Commander of the Most Excellent Order of the British Empire (CBE) for services to medicine by Her Majesty the Queen in 2019.

He is a Fellow of the Academy of Medical Sciences, a Fellow of the Royal Society of Edinburgh, and an Elected Member of Academia Europaea. He is a Fellow of the Royal College of Physicians of Edinburgh and a Fellow of the Royal College of Physicians and Surgeons of Glasgow.

He is the recipient of the Sir James Black Medal of the Royal Society of Edinburgh for "outstanding contribution to the field of immunology" (2017), the Heberden Medal of the British Society for Rheumatology (2018), and the Carol-Nachman Prize for Rheumatology in Germany (2019). Other awards include the Royal Philosophical Society of Glasgow's Thomas Graham Medal (2022), Tenovus Scotland's Lady Margaret McLellan Award (2016), the Laurentian Society's JL Demers Award in Canada (2017), and the British Society for Rheumatology's Michael Mason Prize (2001).
