= Annamaria Iagnocco =

Italian rheumatologist

- Born: 1961 (age 64–65); Latina/Italy
- Education: Sapienza University of Rome
- Known for: Ultrasound in rheumatology, education and training of rheumatologists
- Scientific career
- Fields: Rheumatology
- Workplaces: University of Turin
- Website: www.dscb.unito.it/persone/annamaria.iagnocco

Annamaria Iagnocco (born 1961 in Latina, Italy) is an Italian rheumatologist, scientist and university lecturer. She is Professor in the Department of Clinical and Biological Sciences and Chair of Rheumatology at the University of Turin and Director of the University Department of Rheumatology at the Mauriziano Hospital in Turin.

== Education ==
Annamaria Iagnocco studied medicine at La Sapienza University in Rome, where she graduated with distinction in 1986. Iagnocco completed her further training at the rheumatology clinic at La Sapienza University, where she qualified as a specialist in Rheumatology in 1991 and in Physical therapy and Rehabilitation in 1998.

== Career ==
From 1990 to 2016 Iagnocco was Assistant Professor and Adjunct Professor of Rheumatology at La Sapienza University.

In 2016, Iagnocco was appointed chair and full Professor at the University Hospital of Turin. Since 2016 she has been a member of the Council of the Department of Clinical and Biological Sciences at the University of Turin, and in 2024 she was elected to the Board. In 2024, she also joined the Council of the School of Medicine of the University of Turin.

As a rheumatologist, Iagnocco develops her field at a national and international level. From 2004 to 2020 she was deeply involved in the international initiative OMERACT (Outcome Measures in Rheumatology).

In 2017, she joined the Board of the European Alliance of Associations for Rheumatology, (EULAR), the European umbrella organization for rheumatology based in Switzerland. From 2017 to 2019 she served as Treasurer, and from 2021 to 2023 as President. When she took office, Iagnocco was only the second woman to hold the office of President since the society was founded in 1947. Her responsibilities included the 75th anniversary of EULAR in 2022 and the development of the EULAR Strategy 2024-2028.

In 2023, Iagnocco took over the chairmanship of the Education Committee of the BioMedical Alliance in Europe, a non-profit umbrella organization of European medical societies based in Brussels. The BioMedical Alliance represents hundreds of thousands of doctors, scientists and healthcare professionals in the medical field. The organization is particularly committed to the further development and harmonization of medical research, training and the regulation of clinical trials in Europe. Since January 2025, Iagnocco is a member of the Board.

Iagnocco is the Field Chief Editor of Frontiers in Musculoskeletal Disorders, a peer-reviewed, open access, multidisciplinary medical journal covering all aspects of musculoskeletal diseases, which is published by Frontiers Media. She is also a member of the Editorial Boards of peer-reviewed international journals such as EULAR Rheumatology Open (ERO), Clinical and Experimental Rheumatology, or Medical Ultrasonography. She is a member of the scientific advisory committee of Reumatismo, the official journal of the Italian Society of Rheumatology.

=== Research ===
Annamaria Iagnocco's main interests include education and training, clinical research, therapy monitoring and imaging in rheumatology. Her publications cover rheumatoid arthritis, psoriatic arthritis, osteoarthritis, therapy monitoring and imaging of rheumatic diseases, with a special focus on ultrasound examination and assessment of inflammation. Since 2000, she has been a member of the faculty that defines and continuously updates the training content of the EULAR musculoskeletal ultrasound and imaging courses. As scientific director and organizer of ultrasound courses throughout Europe, she has trained generations of young rheumatologists in this technique. She is involved in national and international clinical trials as well as imaging trials in rheumatic diseases.

Iagnocco has authored or co-authored more than 370 peer-reviewed publications. She has been involved in the development of numerous EULAR Recommendations, which are developed according to a quality-assured methodology that set global standards in the diagnosis, treatment and prevention of rheumatic and musculoskeletal diseases.

Iagnocco has contributed as an author to various EULAR Textbooks; these are rheumatology textbooks published by EULAR. She is a co-author of the chapter on Imaging in the EULAR Textbook on Rheumatic Diseases, BMJ 2018, and co-editor of the Eular Textbook on Musculoskeletal Ultrasound in Rheumatology, BMJ 2016.

=== Selected publications ===
Iagnocco's most cited publications include:

- Rheumatoid arthritis: Extra-articular manifestations and comorbidities
- EULAR recommendations for the use of imaging in the clinical management of peripheral joint osteoarthritis
- Ultrasound in the study and monitoring of osteoarthritis
- Identification of calcium pyrophosphate deposition disease (CPPD) by ultrasound
- Imaging the joint in osteoarthritis: a place for ultrasound? Best Practice and Research
