= Peter Tugwell =

Canadian physician working on health equity

Professor Peter Tugwell OC FRCPC
- Born: March 30, 1944 (age 82); Egypt
- Education: University of London (M.B.B.S., M.D.); McMaster University (M.Sc.)
- Known for: Promoter of clinical epidemiology and evidence-based medicine
- Scientific career
- Fields: Medicine
- Workplaces: University of Ottawa

Peter Tugwell (born March 30, 1944) is a Canadian physician and Professor in the Department of Medicine and School of Epidemiology and Public Health at the University of Ottawa. He is known for promoting clinical epidemiology and evidence-based medicine and for his work on health equity worldwide. In 2013 he was named Officer of the Order of Canada for his efforts as "tireless contributor to global health".

== Early life ==
Tugwell was born in Egypt and raised in India, Germany, and Hong Kong, due to his father having been an officer in the British Army.

=== Family life ===
Tugwell is married to Jane Tugwell and has one son (David) and one daughter (Laura).

== Education and training ==
After earning his medical degree at the Royal Free Hospital of the University of London, Tugwell and his wife moved to Nigeria to pursue his research into liver disease. He returned to England three years later to start a family. In 1975, he emigrated to Canada, where he got a one-year job as chief resident in internal medicine at McMaster University Medical School. There, a chance encounter with David Sackett lead him to take a course in clinical epidemiology, and he subsequently enrolled in the master's program.

== Career ==
A year after finishing his master's degree, Tugwell joined the faculty of the department of epidemiology at McMaster University Medical School. Two years later he became chair of the department of clinical epidemiology and biostatistics, a position he held for two five-year terms. In 1991 he moved to Ottawa as chair of the Department of Medicine at the University of Ottawa. After ten years in the position, he became the director of the Centre for Global Health at the University of Ottawa. In 2001 he was appointed as co-editor-in-chief for the Journal of Clinical Epidemiology.

Tugwell holds the Canada Research Chair in Health Equity at the University of Ottawa, focused on improving health for the world's poor.

Tugwell has been instrumental in the creation of multinational collaborations in different clinical epidemiology areas. He was the founding director of the International Clinical Epidemiology Network Training Centre at McMaster University from 1982 to 1991, becoming later the Secretary of INCLEN's North American group (CanUSAClen). Tugwell is one of the founders of the Cochrane Collaboration, a nonprofit organization that conducts systematic reviews of health care interventions, diagnostic tests and prognostic studies. Tugwell was the chair of the first annual Cochrane Colloquium in Oxford, UK, in 1993. This same year he became the founding co-ordinating editor of Cochrane Musculoskeletal. In 2005 he registered the Campbell and Cochrane Equity Methods group to promote a better reporting of the effects of interventions not only on the general population, but also on the disadvantaged in order to build the evidence base of interventions that could reduce health inequities.

In 1992, together with Maarten Boers they sparked the creation of OMERACT, an organization that "strives to improve endpoint outcome measurement through a data driven, iterative consensus process involving relevant stakeholder groups". OMERACT is the pioneer organization promoting core outcome sets in clinical trials.

Tugwell has published more than 1000 papers and make it to the top one-percent World Highly Cited Researchers Listing in social sciences created by Web of Science in 2019, 2020 and 2021.

His previous students include Vivian Welch.

== Notable awards and honours ==
Tugwell is a fellow of the Canadian Academy of Health Sciences.

In 2008 he received the Canadian Institutes of Health Research Michael Smith Prize as Canada's 2008 Health Researcher of the Year for Health Services and Systems and Population Health Research.

In 2013 he was awarded as Officer of the Order of Canada for "his contributions as an epidemiologist reducing global disparities in health care access". In 2020 he received the 2020 CIHR Barer-Flood Prize that honours and recognizes an exceptional researcher in the area of health services and policy research.

== Selected textbooks ==
- Tugwell P, Boers M, Simon L, Strand V, Wells G, Shea B, Brooks P. Evidence-based rheumatology. London: BMJ books, 2005.
- Haynes RB, Tugwell P, Sackett DL, Guyatt GH. Clinical Epidemiology: How to Do Clinical Practice Research, Third Edition. Philadelphia: Lippincott, Williams and Wilkins, 2005.

== See also ==
- Peter Tugwell publications indexed by Google Scholar
