= 2001 24 Hours of Daytona =

Previous: 2000	Next: 2002
Index: Races | Winners

Track map of Daytona International Speedway

The 2001 Rolex 24 at Daytona was a Grand-Am Rolex Sports Car Series 24-hour endurance sports car race held on February 3–4, 2001 at the Daytona International Speedway road course. The race served as the first round of the 2001 Rolex Sports Car Series. The race saw increased media attention due to Dale Earnhardt and Dale Earnhardt Jr. competing together for Corvette Racing. The father-son duo finished the race 4th overall. Earnhardt died two weeks later in the 2001 Daytona 500.

Victory overall and in the GTS class went to the No. 2 Chevrolet Corvette C5-R from Corvette Racing, driven by Johnny O'Connell, Ron Fellows, Chris Kneifel, and Franck Fréon. The GT class was won by the No. 31 Porsche 996 GT3-RS from White Lightning Racing, driven by Christian Menzel, Randy Pobst, Mike Fitzgerald, and Lucas Luhr. The SRP class was won by the No. 63 Kudzu DLY from Downing/Atlanta Racing, driven by Howard Katz, Chris Ronson, A. J. Smith, and Jim Downing. The SRP II class was won by the No. 21 Archangel Motorsport Services Lola B2K/40, driven by Andy Lally, Paul Macey, Martin Henderson, and Peter Seldon. Finally, the AGT class was won by the No. 11 Hamilton Safe Motorsports Chevrolet Camaro, driven by Ken Bupp, Dick Greer, Doug Mills, and Simon Gregg.

== Race results ==
Class winners in bold.

Pos	Class	No	Team	Drivers	Chassis	Tire	Laps
Pos	Class	No	Team	Drivers	Engine	Tire	Laps
1	**GTS**	**2**	**(United States) Corvette Racing**	**(United States) Johnny O'Connell (Canada) Ron Fellows (United States) Chris Kneifel (France) Franck Fréon**	**Chevrolet Corvette C5-R**	G	**656**
1	**GTS**	**2**	**(United States) Corvette Racing**	**(United States) Johnny O'Connell (Canada) Ron Fellows (United States) Chris Kneifel (France) Franck Fréon**	**Chevrolet 7.0 L V8**	G	**656**
2	**GT**	**31**	**(United States) White Lightning Racing**	**(Germany) Christian Menzel (United States) Randy Pobst (United States) Mike Fitzgerald (Germany) Lucas Luhr**	**Porsche 996 GT3-RS**	D	**648**
2	**GT**	**31**	**(United States) White Lightning Racing**	**(Germany) Christian Menzel (United States) Randy Pobst (United States) Mike Fitzgerald (Germany) Lucas Luhr**	**Porsche 3.6 L Flat-6**	D	**648**
3	GT	86	(Germany) Freisinger Motorsport	(Germany) Wolfgang Kaufmann (United States) Lance Stewart (France) Cyril Chateau (Spain) Paco Orti	Porsche 996 GT3-RS	Y	644
3	GT	86	(Germany) Freisinger Motorsport	(Germany) Wolfgang Kaufmann (United States) Lance Stewart (France) Cyril Chateau (Spain) Paco Orti	Porsche 3.6 L Flat-6	Y	644
4	GTS	3	(United States) Corvette Racing	(United States) Dale Earnhardt (United States) Dale Earnhardt Jr. (United States) Andy Pilgrim (United States) Kelly Collins	Chevrolet Corvette C5-R	G	642
4	GTS	3	(United States) Corvette Racing	(United States) Dale Earnhardt (United States) Dale Earnhardt Jr. (United States) Andy Pilgrim (United States) Kelly Collins	Chevrolet 7.0 L V8	G	642
5	GT	56	(Germany) Seikel Motorsport	(Italy) Gabrio Rosa (Italy) Fabio Rosa (Italy) Fabio Babini (Italy) Alex Caffi	Porsche 996 GT3-RS	Y	637
5	GT	56	(Germany) Seikel Motorsport	(Italy) Gabrio Rosa (Italy) Fabio Rosa (Italy) Fabio Babini (Italy) Alex Caffi	Porsche 3.6 L Flat-6	Y	637
6	GTS	01	(Canada) Bytzek Motorsport	(United States) Larry Schumacher (Canada) Harry Bytzek (Canada) John Brenner (Canada) James Holtom	Porsche 911 GT1 Evo	D	632
6	GTS	01	(Canada) Bytzek Motorsport	(United States) Larry Schumacher (Canada) Harry Bytzek (Canada) John Brenner (Canada) James Holtom	Porsche 3.6 L Turbo Flat-6	D	632
7	GT	43	(United States) Orbit Racing	(United States) Peter Baron (United States) Kyle Petty (United States) Gian Luigi Buitoni (United States) Leo Hindery (United States) Tony Kester	Porsche 996 GT3-RS	D	630
7	GT	43	(United States) Orbit Racing	(United States) Peter Baron (United States) Kyle Petty (United States) Gian Luigi Buitoni (United States) Leo Hindery (United States) Tony Kester	Porsche 3.6 L Flat-6	D	630
8	GT	81	(United States) G&W Motorsports	(United States) Darren Law (United States) Matt Drendel (United States) David Murry (United States) Cort Wagner	Porsche 996 GT3-R	Y	629
8	GT	81	(United States) G&W Motorsports	(United States) Darren Law (United States) Matt Drendel (United States) David Murry (United States) Cort Wagner	Porsche 3.6 L Flat-6	Y	629
9	GT	10	(United States) Genesis Racing	(United States) Bill Auberlen (United States) Chris Gleason (United States) Rick Fairbanks (United States) Chris Miller	BMW M3 E46	Y	627
9	GT	10	(United States) Genesis Racing	(United States) Bill Auberlen (United States) Chris Gleason (United States) Rick Fairbanks (United States) Chris Miller	BMW 3.2 L I6	Y	627
10	GT	39	(United States) White Lightning Racing	(United States) Hugh Plumb (United States) Kimberly Hiskey (Canada) Michael Culver (United States) Michael Petersen	Porsche 996 GT3-R	D	627
10	GT	39	(United States) White Lightning Racing	(United States) Hugh Plumb (United States) Kimberly Hiskey (Canada) Michael Culver (United States) Michael Petersen	Porsche 3.6 L Flat-6	D	627
11	**SRP**	**63**	**(United States) Downing/Atlanta Racing**	**(United States) Howard Katz (United States) Chris Ronson (United States) A. J. Smith (United States) Jim Downing**	**Kudzu DLY**	G	**624**
11	**SRP**	**63**	**(United States) Downing/Atlanta Racing**	**(United States) Howard Katz (United States) Chris Ronson (United States) A. J. Smith (United States) Jim Downing**	**Mazda 4-Rotor**	G	**624**
12	GT	50	(United States) AASCO-Boduck	(United States) Craig Stanton (United States) Andy Hajducky (Japan) Takashi Suzuki	Porsche 996 GT3-R	Y	618
12	GT	50	(United States) AASCO-Boduck	(United States) Craig Stanton (United States) Andy Hajducky (Japan) Takashi Suzuki	Porsche 3.6 L Flat-6	Y	618
13	**SRP II**	**21**	**(United States) Archangel Motorsport Services**	**(United States) Andy Lally (Canada) Paul Macey (United Kingdom) Martin Henderson (United Kingdom) Peter Seldon**	**Lola B2K/40**	A	**600**
13	**SRP II**	**21**	**(United States) Archangel Motorsport Services**	**(United States) Andy Lally (Canada) Paul Macey (United Kingdom) Martin Henderson (United Kingdom) Peter Seldon**	**Nissan 3.0 L V6**	A	**600**
14 DNF	SRP	16	(United States) Dyson Racing	(United Kingdom) James Weaver (United States) Butch Leitzinger (United Kingdom) Andy Wallace	Riley & Scott Mk III	G	598
14 DNF	SRP	16	(United States) Dyson Racing	(United Kingdom) James Weaver (United States) Butch Leitzinger (United Kingdom) Andy Wallace	Ford 6.0 L V8	G	598
15	GT	34	(United States) Spencer Pumpelly Racing	(United States) Spencer Pumpelly (United States) Stevan Ivankovich (United States) Tom Pumpelly (United States) Rick Dilorio	Porsche 996 GT3-R	D	595
15	GT	34	(United States) Spencer Pumpelly Racing	(United States) Spencer Pumpelly (United States) Stevan Ivankovich (United States) Tom Pumpelly (United States) Rick Dilorio	Porsche 3.6 L Flat-6	D	595
16	GT	40	(Italy) MAC Racing	(Italy) Antonio De Castro (Italy) Luca Cattaneo (Italy) Renato Bicciato (Italy) Franco Bugané	Porsche 996 GT3-R	D	593
16	GT	40	(Italy) MAC Racing	(Italy) Antonio De Castro (Italy) Luca Cattaneo (Italy) Renato Bicciato (Italy) Franco Bugané	Porsche 3.6 L Flat-6	D	593
17	GT	57	(Germany) Seikel Motorsport	(Italy) Stefano Buttiero (United States) Philip Collin (New Zealand) Andrew Bagnall (Canada) Tony Burgess	Porsche 996 GT3-R	Y	590
17	GT	57	(Germany) Seikel Motorsport	(Italy) Stefano Buttiero (United States) Philip Collin (New Zealand) Andrew Bagnall (Canada) Tony Burgess	Porsche 3.6 L Flat-6	Y	590
18	GT	71	(Germany) Freisinger Motorsport	(Japan) Yukihiro Hane (United States) Kurt Thiel (Germany) Klaus Horn (Austria) Manfred Jurasz	Porsche 996 GT3-R	Y	585
18	GT	71	(Germany) Freisinger Motorsport	(Japan) Yukihiro Hane (United States) Kurt Thiel (Germany) Klaus Horn (Austria) Manfred Jurasz	Porsche 3.6 L Flat-6	Y	585
19	SRP	20	(United States) Dyson Racing	(United States) Elliott Forbes-Robinson (United States) Rob Dyson (Italy) Max Papis (Sweden) Niclas Jönsson	Riley & Scott Mk III	G	584
19	SRP	20	(United States) Dyson Racing	(United States) Elliott Forbes-Robinson (United States) Rob Dyson (Italy) Max Papis (Sweden) Niclas Jönsson	Ford 6.0 L V8	G	584
20	SRP II	62	(United States) Team Spencer Motorsports	(United States) Rich Grupp (United States) Ryan Hampton (United States) Dennis Spencer	Kudzu DLM	G	577
20	SRP II	62	(United States) Team Spencer Motorsports	(United States) Rich Grupp (United States) Ryan Hampton (United States) Dennis Spencer	Mazda 3-Rotor	G	577
21	SRP	37	(United States) Intersport Racing	(United States) Jon Field (Sweden) Carl Rosenblad (United States) Joel Field (United States) Clint Field	Lola B2K/10	G	566
21	SRP	37	(United States) Intersport Racing	(United States) Jon Field (Sweden) Carl Rosenblad (United States) Joel Field (United States) Clint Field	Judd 4.0 L V10	G	566
22 DNF	SRP	74	(United States) Robinson Racing	(United States) Jack Baldwin (United States) George Robinson (United States) Irv Hoerr (United States) Buddy Lazier	Riley & Scott Mk III	G	563
22 DNF	SRP	74	(United States) Robinson Racing	(United States) Jack Baldwin (United States) George Robinson (United States) Irv Hoerr (United States) Buddy Lazier	Judd 4.0 L V10	G	563
23	GT	14	(United States) Autometrics Motorsports	(United States) Cory Friedman (United States) Adam Merzon (United Kingdom) Basil Demeroutis (United States) Lynn Wilson	Porsche 993 Carrera RSR	D	563
23	GT	14	(United States) Autometrics Motorsports	(United States) Cory Friedman (United States) Adam Merzon (United Kingdom) Basil Demeroutis (United States) Lynn Wilson	Porsche 3.8 L Flat-6	D	563
24	GTS	24	(Netherlands) Marcos Racing International	(Netherlands) Cor Euser (United Kingdom) Calum Lockie (Netherlands) Herman Buurman	Marcos Mantara LM600	D	562
24	GTS	24	(Netherlands) Marcos Racing International	(Netherlands) Cor Euser (United Kingdom) Calum Lockie (Netherlands) Herman Buurman	Chevrolet 6.9 L V8	D	562
25	GT	41	(Italy) MAC Racing	(Italy) Fabio Mancini (Italy) Gianni Collini (Italy) Paolo Rapetti (Belgium) Michel Neugarten	Porsche 996 GT3-RS	D	561
25	GT	41	(Italy) MAC Racing	(Italy) Fabio Mancini (Italy) Gianni Collini (Italy) Paolo Rapetti (Belgium) Michel Neugarten	Porsche 3.6 L Flat-6	D	561
26	GT	67	(United States) The Racer's Group	(United States) Don Kitch Jr. (United States) Dave Gaylord (United States) Dave Parker (United States) Mike Oberholtzer	Porsche 996 GT3-R	G	560
26	GT	67	(United States) The Racer's Group	(United States) Don Kitch Jr. (United States) Dave Gaylord (United States) Dave Parker (United States) Mike Oberholtzer	Porsche 3.6 L Flat-6	G	560
27	GTS	25	(Netherlands) Marcos Racing International	(Spain) Miguel Ángel de Castro (Netherlands) Peter van der Kolk (El Salvador) Toto Lassally	Marcos Mantara LM600	D	557
27	GTS	25	(Netherlands) Marcos Racing International	(Spain) Miguel Ángel de Castro (Netherlands) Peter van der Kolk (El Salvador) Toto Lassally	Chevrolet 6.0 L V8	D	557
28	**AGT**	**11**	**(United States) Hamilton Safe Motorsports**	**(United States) Ken Bupp (United States) Dick Greer (Canada) Doug Mills (United States) Simon Gregg**	**Chevrolet Camaro**	G	**553**
28	**AGT**	**11**	**(United States) Hamilton Safe Motorsports**	**(United States) Ken Bupp (United States) Dick Greer (Canada) Doug Mills (United States) Simon Gregg**	**Chevrolet 5.9 L V8**	G	**553**
29	GT	66	(United States) The Racer's Group	(United States) Wade Gaughran (United States) Justin Marks (United States) Steve Miller (Japan) Kiichi Takahashi	Porsche 996 GT3-R	G	547
29	GT	66	(United States) The Racer's Group	(United States) Wade Gaughran (United States) Justin Marks (United States) Steve Miller (Japan) Kiichi Takahashi	Porsche 3.6 L Flat-6	G	547
30	GT	55	(Japan) Club: Yellow Magic	(Japan) Toshio Suzuki (Japan) Tsuyoshi Takahashi (Japan) Syougo Mitsuyama (Japan) Shinichi Yamaji	Ferrari F355	Y	543
30	GT	55	(Japan) Club: Yellow Magic	(Japan) Toshio Suzuki (Japan) Tsuyoshi Takahashi (Japan) Syougo Mitsuyama (Japan) Shinichi Yamaji	Ferrari F129B 3.9 L V8	Y	543
31	GTS	114	(United Kingdom) Chamberlain Motorsports	(Italy) Stefano Zonca (Italy) Raffaele Sangiuolo (Venezuela) Milka Duno (United Kingdom) David Gooding	Dodge Viper GTS-R	D	530
31	GTS	114	(United Kingdom) Chamberlain Motorsports	(Italy) Stefano Zonca (Italy) Raffaele Sangiuolo (Venezuela) Milka Duno (United Kingdom) David Gooding	Dodge 8.0 L V10	D	530
32	GT	52	(United States) Safina Racing	(United States) Scooter Gabel (United States) Joseph Safina (United States) Doc Lowman (United States) Carlos de Quesada	BMW M3	Y	530
32	GT	52	(United States) Safina Racing	(United States) Scooter Gabel (United States) Joseph Safina (United States) Doc Lowman (United States) Carlos de Quesada	BMW 3.2 L I6	Y	530
33	AGT	09	(United States) Team X1-R	(United States) Craig Conway (United States) Erik Messley (United States) Doug Goad (United States) Richard Maugeri	Chevrolet Camaro	G	528
33	AGT	09	(United States) Team X1-R	(United States) Craig Conway (United States) Erik Messley (United States) Doug Goad (United States) Richard Maugeri	Chevrolet 5.9 L V8	G	528
34	GT	9	(United States) Genesis Racing	(United States) Marc Bunting (United States) Emil Assentato (United States) Philip Schearer (United States) Steve Ahlgrim	BMW M3	Y	510
34	GT	9	(United States) Genesis Racing	(United States) Marc Bunting (United States) Emil Assentato (United States) Philip Schearer (United States) Steve Ahlgrim	BMW 3.2 L I6	Y	510
35 DNF	GT	05	(Switzerland) Haberthur Racing	(Spain) Francesc Gutiérrez (United Kingdom) Nigel Smith (France) Patrick Vuillaume (France) Jean-Charles Cartier	Porsche 996 GT3-R	D	505
35 DNF	GT	05	(Switzerland) Haberthur Racing	(Spain) Francesc Gutiérrez (United Kingdom) Nigel Smith (France) Patrick Vuillaume (France) Jean-Charles Cartier	Porsche 3.6 L Flat-6	D	505
36	GTS	30	(Italy) Mastercar	(Italy) Fabian Peroni (Sweden) Tony Ring (Russia) Sergey Zlobin (Italy) Andrea Montermini	Ferrari F355	K	505
36	GTS	30	(Italy) Mastercar	(Italy) Fabian Peroni (Sweden) Tony Ring (Russia) Sergey Zlobin (Italy) Andrea Montermini	Ferrari F129B 3.9 L V8	K	505
37 DNF	SRP II	26	(United States) Northstar Racing	(United States) Cass Whitehead (United States) B. J. Zacharias (United States) Jeff Giangrande (United Kingdom) Chris Hall	Lola B2K/40	A	498
37 DNF	SRP II	26	(United States) Northstar Racing	(United States) Cass Whitehead (United States) B. J. Zacharias (United States) Jeff Giangrande (United Kingdom) Chris Hall	Nissan 3.0 L V6	A	498
38	GTS	69	(Germany) Proton Competition	(Austria) Horst Felbermayr (Austria) Horst Felbermayr Jr. (Germany) Christian Ried (Germany) Gerold Ried	Porsche 911 GT2	Y	495
38	GTS	69	(Germany) Proton Competition	(Austria) Horst Felbermayr (Austria) Horst Felbermayr Jr. (Germany) Christian Ried (Germany) Gerold Ried	Porsche 3.6 L Flat-6	Y	495
39 DNF	GT	54	(United States) JET Motorsports	(United States) Toney Jennings (United States) Terry Borcheller (United States) Boris Said (Germany) Hans-Joachim Stuck	BMW M3 E46 GTR	Y	490
39 DNF	GT	54	(United States) JET Motorsports	(United States) Toney Jennings (United States) Terry Borcheller (United States) Boris Said (Germany) Hans-Joachim Stuck	BMW 5.0 L V8	Y	490
40 DNF	AGT	44	(United States) Team Amick Motorsports	(United States) Joe Varde (United States) David Amick (United States) Lyndon Amick (United States) Bill Lester	Chevrolet Corvette	G	488
40 DNF	AGT	44	(United States) Team Amick Motorsports	(United States) Joe Varde (United States) David Amick (United States) Lyndon Amick (United States) Bill Lester	Chevrolet 6.1 L V8	G	488
41	GTS	0	(Canada) Bytzek Motorsport	(Canada) Scott Maxwell (Canada) David Empringham (Canada) Richard Spenard (Canada) Klaus Bytzek	Porsche 911 GT1 Evo	D	479
41	GTS	0	(Canada) Bytzek Motorsport	(Canada) Scott Maxwell (Canada) David Empringham (Canada) Richard Spenard (Canada) Klaus Bytzek	Porsche 3.6 L Turbo Flat-6	D	479
42	GT	65	(United Kingdom) Cirtek Motorsport	(Germany) Claudia Hürtgen (United States) Robert Orcutt (Germany) Jürgen Lornez (Germany) Heinrich Langfermann	Porsche 996 GT3-R	D	477
42	GT	65	(United Kingdom) Cirtek Motorsport	(Germany) Claudia Hürtgen (United States) Robert Orcutt (Germany) Jürgen Lornez (Germany) Heinrich Langfermann	Porsche 3.6 L Flat-6	D	477
43 DNF	SRP II	89	(Canada) Porschehaus Racing	(Canada) Greg Pootmans (Canada) Bruno St. Jacques (Canada) Robert Julian (United States) Bob Woodman	Lola B2K/40	G	473
43 DNF	SRP II	89	(Canada) Porschehaus Racing	(Canada) Greg Pootmans (Canada) Bruno St. Jacques (Canada) Robert Julian (United States) Bob Woodman	Nissan 3.0 L V6	G	473
44 DNF	GT	60	(United Kingdom) PK Sport	(United Kingdom) Geoff Lister (United Kingdom) Mike Youles (United Kingdom) Fred Moss (United States) Matt Turner	Porsche 996 GT3-R	D	471
44 DNF	GT	60	(United Kingdom) PK Sport	(United Kingdom) Geoff Lister (United Kingdom) Mike Youles (United Kingdom) Fred Moss (United States) Matt Turner	Porsche 3.6 L Flat-6	D	471
45 DNF	GTS	07	(United States) G&W Motorsports	(United States) Steve Marshall (United States) Danny Marshall (United States) Johannes van Overbeek (United States) Tim Holt	Porsche 911 GT2	Y	470
45 DNF	GTS	07	(United States) G&W Motorsports	(United States) Steve Marshall (United States) Danny Marshall (United States) Johannes van Overbeek (United States) Tim Holt	Porsche 3.6 L Turbo Flat-6	Y	470
46 DNF	SRP	12	(United States) Risi Competizione	(Germany) Ralf Kelleners (United Kingdom) Allan McNish (Australia) David Brabham (Belgium) Eric van de Poele	Ferrari 333 SP	G	462
46 DNF	SRP	12	(United States) Risi Competizione	(Germany) Ralf Kelleners (United Kingdom) Allan McNish (Australia) David Brabham (Belgium) Eric van de Poele	Ferrari F310E 4.0 L V12	G	462
47 DNF	SRP II	22	(United States) Archangel Motorsport Services	(United States) Andrew Davis (United States) Tony Dudek (United States) Mike Durand (United States) Jeff Clinton	Lola B2K/40	A	460
47 DNF	SRP II	22	(United States) Archangel Motorsport Services	(United States) Andrew Davis (United States) Tony Dudek (United States) Mike Durand (United States) Jeff Clinton	Nissan 3.0 L V6	A	460
48	AGT	96	(United States) Tropic Zone Racing	(United States) Dave Bacher (United States) Anthony Puleo (Switzerland) Hans Hauser (Switzerland) Robert Dubler	Oldsmobile Cutlass	G	407
48	AGT	96	(United States) Tropic Zone Racing	(United States) Dave Bacher (United States) Anthony Puleo (Switzerland) Hans Hauser (Switzerland) Robert Dubler	Chevrolet 6.1 L V8	G	407
49	GT	68	(United States) The Racer's Group	(United States) Kevin Buckler (United States) Jim Michaelian (United States) Stephen Earle (Sri Lanka) Dilantha Malagamuwa	Porsche 996 GT3-RS	Y	354
49	GT	68	(United States) The Racer's Group	(United States) Kevin Buckler (United States) Jim Michaelian (United States) Stephen Earle (Sri Lanka) Dilantha Malagamuwa	Porsche 3.6 L Flat-6	Y	354
50	GT	32	(United States) Goldin Bros Racing	(United States) Steve Goldin (United States) Keith Goldin (United States) Scott Finlay (United States) Dave Rankin	Mazda RX-7	G	351
50	GT	32	(United States) Goldin Bros Racing	(United States) Steve Goldin (United States) Keith Goldin (United States) Scott Finlay (United States) Dave Rankin	Mazda 2-Rotor	G	351
51 DNF	SRP	4	(United States) Philip Creighton Motorsports	(United States) Duncan Dayton (United Kingdom) John Burton (United States) Rick Sutherland (United States) Scott Schubot	Lola B2K/10	G	347
51 DNF	SRP	4	(United States) Philip Creighton Motorsports	(United States) Duncan Dayton (United Kingdom) John Burton (United States) Rick Sutherland (United States) Scott Schubot	Ford 6.0 L V8	G	347
52 DNF	GT	35	(Germany) Jürgen Alzen Motorsports	(Germany) Ulli Richter (Switzerland) Enzo Calderari (Switzerland) Lilian Bryner (Germany) Jürgen Alzen	Porsche 996 GT3-R	Y	315
52 DNF	GT	35	(Germany) Jürgen Alzen Motorsports	(Germany) Ulli Richter (Switzerland) Enzo Calderari (Switzerland) Lilian Bryner (Germany) Jürgen Alzen	Porsche 3.6 L Flat-6	Y	315
53 DNF	GT	17	(Germany) RWS Motorsports	(Italy) Luca Riccitelli (Austria) Dieter Quester (Belgium) Marc Duez (Austria) Hans-Jörg Hofer	Porsche 996 GT3-R	D	310
53 DNF	GT	17	(Germany) RWS Motorsports	(Italy) Luca Riccitelli (Austria) Dieter Quester (Belgium) Marc Duez (Austria) Hans-Jörg Hofer	Porsche 3.6 L Flat-6	D	310
54 DNF	SRP II	79	Sportscar Racing Team Sweden	(Sweden) Thed Björk (Sweden) Niklas Loven (Sweden) Stanley Dickens (United States) Larry Oberto	Lola B2K/40	A	241
54 DNF	SRP II	79	Sportscar Racing Team Sweden	(Sweden) Thed Björk (Sweden) Niklas Loven (Sweden) Stanley Dickens (United States) Larry Oberto	Nissan 3.0 L V6	A	241
55 DNF	AGT	18	(United States) Comer Racing	(United States) Jack Willes (United States) Andy McNeil (United States) Jon Leavy (United States) Les Vallarano	Chevrolet Corvette	G	238
55 DNF	AGT	18	(United States) Comer Racing	(United States) Jack Willes (United States) Andy McNeil (United States) Jon Leavy (United States) Les Vallarano	Chevrolet 5.9 L V8	G	238
56 DNF	GT	47	(United States) Evil Eye Racing	(United States) Joe Foster (United States) Gary Schultheis (United States) Scott Neumann (United States) Ross Bleustein	Porsche 996 GT3-RS	D	233
56 DNF	GT	47	(United States) Evil Eye Racing	(United States) Joe Foster (United States) Gary Schultheis (United States) Scott Neumann (United States) Ross Bleustein	Porsche 3.6 L Flat-6	D	233
57	GT	7	(United States) Broadfoot Racing	(Spain) Jesús Diez de Villarroel (Spain) Paco Orti (United States) John Warner (United States) Ronald Zitza	Porsche 996 GT3-R	D	222
57	GT	7	(United States) Broadfoot Racing	(Spain) Jesús Diez de Villarroel (Spain) Paco Orti (United States) John Warner (United States) Ronald Zitza	Porsche 3.6 L Flat-6	D	222
58 DNF	SRP II	48	(United States) Pilbeam Racing America	(United States) Shane Lewis (Belgium) Bruno Lambert (Switzerland) Toni Seiler	Pilbeam MP84	A	216
58 DNF	SRP II	48	(United States) Pilbeam Racing America	(United States) Shane Lewis (Belgium) Bruno Lambert (Switzerland) Toni Seiler	Nissan 3.0 L V6	A	216
59 DNF	SRP	38	(United States) Champion Racing	(United States) Dorsey Schroeder (France) Bob Wollek (United States) Hurley Haywood (Germany) Sascha Maassen	Lola B2K/10	G	209
59 DNF	SRP	38	(United States) Champion Racing	(United States) Dorsey Schroeder (France) Bob Wollek (United States) Hurley Haywood (Germany) Sascha Maassen	Porsche 3.6 L Turbo Flat-6	G	209
60 DNF	GT	80	(United States) G&W Motorsports	(United States) John Morton (United States) Michael Schrom (United States) Bob Mazzuoccola (United States) Stu Hayner	Porsche 996 GT3-R	Y	185
60 DNF	GT	80	(United States) G&W Motorsports	(United States) John Morton (United States) Michael Schrom (United States) Bob Mazzuoccola (United States) Stu Hayner	Porsche 3.6 L Flat-6	Y	185
61 DNF	SRP	27	(United States) Lista Doran Racing	(Belgium) Didier Theys (Switzerland) Fredy Lienhard (Canada) Ross Bentley (Italy) Mauro Baldi	Crawford SSC2K	Y	181
61 DNF	SRP	27	(United States) Lista Doran Racing	(Belgium) Didier Theys (Switzerland) Fredy Lienhard (Canada) Ross Bentley (Italy) Mauro Baldi	Judd 4.0 L V10	Y	181
62 DNF	SRP	78	(United States) Sezio Florida Racing Team	(France) Patrice Roussel (United States) John Macaluso (France) Edouard Sezionale (France) Georges Forgeois	Norma M2000-01	G	179
62 DNF	SRP	78	(United States) Sezio Florida Racing Team	(France) Patrice Roussel (United States) John Macaluso (France) Edouard Sezionale (France) Georges Forgeois	Mader (BMW) 4.0 L V8	G	179
63 DNF	SRP II	6	(United States) TRP Racing	(United States) Jeff Bucknum (United States) Brent Sherman (United States) Travis Duder (United States) Gary Tiller	Lola B2K/40	G	138
63 DNF	SRP II	6	(United States) TRP Racing	(United States) Jeff Bucknum (United States) Brent Sherman (United States) Travis Duder (United States) Gary Tiller	Nissan 3.0 L V6	G	138
64 DNF	AGT	53	(United States) Diablo Racing	(United States) Eric Curran (United States) Mayo T. Smith (United States) Todd Snyder (United States) Tom Scheuren	Chevrolet Camaro	G	125
64 DNF	AGT	53	(United States) Diablo Racing	(United States) Eric Curran (United States) Mayo T. Smith (United States) Todd Snyder (United States) Tom Scheuren	Chevrolet 5.1 L V8	G	125
65	AGT	46	(United States) ACP Motorsports	(United States) Kerry Hitt (United States) Jerry Thompson (United States) Joe Nagle (United States) Rodger Bogusz	Chevrolet Corvette	H	117
65	AGT	46	(United States) ACP Motorsports	(United States) Kerry Hitt (United States) Jerry Thompson (United States) Joe Nagle (United States) Rodger Bogusz	Chevrolet 5.8 L V8	H	117
66 DNF	SRP	06	(United States) Jacobs Motorsports	(United States) Todd Snyder (United States) Peter Argetsinger (United States) Nick Longhi (United States) Michael Jacobs	Riley & Scott Mk III	D	112
66 DNF	SRP	06	(United States) Jacobs Motorsports	(United States) Todd Snyder (United States) Peter Argetsinger (United States) Nick Longhi (United States) Michael Jacobs	Ford 6.0 L V8	D	112
67 DNF	GT	92	(United States) Cirtek Motorsport	(Germany) Hubert Haupt (Belgium) Anthony Kumpen (United States) Vic Rice (United States) John Young	Porsche 996 GT3-R	D	108
67 DNF	GT	92	(United States) Cirtek Motorsport	(Germany) Hubert Haupt (Belgium) Anthony Kumpen (United States) Vic Rice (United States) John Young	Porsche 3.6 L Flat-6	D	108
68 DNF	GT	36	(Germany) Jürgen Alzen Racing	(Italy) Angelo Zadra (Portugal) Pedro Couceiro (Germany) Ulrich Gallade (Netherlands) Duncan Huisman	Porsche 996 GT3-RS	Y	106
68 DNF	GT	36	(Germany) Jürgen Alzen Racing	(Italy) Angelo Zadra (Portugal) Pedro Couceiro (Germany) Ulrich Gallade (Netherlands) Duncan Huisman	Porsche 3.6 L Flat-6	Y	106
69 DNF	SRP	8	(Germany) Konrad Motorsport	(Austria) Franz Konrad (Australia) Alan Heath (United States) Charles Slater (Brazil) Gualter Salles	Lola B2K/10	G	96
69 DNF	SRP	8	(Germany) Konrad Motorsport	(Austria) Franz Konrad (Australia) Alan Heath (United States) Charles Slater (Brazil) Gualter Salles	Ford 6.0 L V8	G	96
70 DNF	SRP	83	(United States) Bob Akin Motorsports	(Germany) Norman Simon (United States) Mark Simo (United States) Brian DeVries (Germany) Michael Lauer	Riley & Scott Mk III	Y	92
70 DNF	SRP	83	(United States) Bob Akin Motorsports	(Germany) Norman Simon (United States) Mark Simo (United States) Brian DeVries (Germany) Michael Lauer	Ford 6.0 L V8	Y	92
71	AGT	23	(United States) Gwen Racing	(United States) Mark Montgomery (United States) Sim Penton (France) Pascal Dro (France) Patrick Cachet	Chevrolet Camaro	P	67
71	AGT	23	(United States) Gwen Racing	(United States) Mark Montgomery (United States) Sim Penton (France) Pascal Dro (France) Patrick Cachet	Chevrolet 6.0 L V8	P	67
72 DNF	SRP	28	(United States) Intersport Racing	(United States) Spencer Trenery (United States) Frank Emmett (United States) Bruce Trenery (Belgium) Patrick van Schoote	Riley & Scott Mk III	G	62
72 DNF	SRP	28	(United States) Intersport Racing	(United States) Spencer Trenery (United States) Frank Emmett (United States) Bruce Trenery (Belgium) Patrick van Schoote	Ford 5.1 L V8	G	62
73 DNF	GT	02	(United States) Morrison/Mosler Racing	(Portugal) João Barbosa (United States) Scott Deware (United States) John Heinricy (United States) Jim Minneker	Mosler MT900 R	D	61
73 DNF	GT	02	(United States) Morrison/Mosler Racing	(Portugal) João Barbosa (United States) Scott Deware (United States) John Heinricy (United States) Jim Minneker	Chevrolet 5.7 L V8	D	61
74 DNF	GTS	5	(United States) Rocketsports Racing	(United States) Paul Gentilozzi (United States) Scott Pruett (United States) Johnny Miller (United States) Anthony Lazzaro	Saleen S7-R	G	50
74 DNF	GTS	5	(United States) Rocketsports Racing	(United States) Paul Gentilozzi (United States) Scott Pruett (United States) Johnny Miller (United States) Anthony Lazzaro	Ford 6.9 L V8	G	50
75 DNF	GTS	91	(United Kingdom) Cirtek Motorsport	(United Kingdom) David Warnock (United States) Ugo Colombo (Portugal) Bernardo Sá Nogueira (Australia) Christian D'Agostin	Porsche 911 GT2	D	48
75 DNF	GTS	91	(United Kingdom) Cirtek Motorsport	(United Kingdom) David Warnock (United States) Ugo Colombo (Portugal) Bernardo Sá Nogueira (Australia) Christian D'Agostin	Porsche 3.6 L Turbo Flat-6	D	48
76 DNF	GTS	15	(United Kingdom) Chamberlain Motorsports	(United Kingdom) Christian Vann (United States) Chris Bingham (Japan) Seiji Ara (United Kingdom) Robert Nearn	Dodge Viper GTS-R	D	45
76 DNF	GTS	15	(United Kingdom) Chamberlain Motorsports	(United Kingdom) Christian Vann (United States) Chris Bingham (Japan) Seiji Ara (United Kingdom) Robert Nearn	Dodge 8.0 L V10	D	45
77 DNF	GT	42	(United States) Orbit Racing	(Republic of Ireland) Tommy Byrne (United States) Richard Millman (United States) Tony Kester (United States) Michael Collucci	Porsche 996 GT3-RS	D	37
77 DNF	GT	42	(United States) Orbit Racing	(Republic of Ireland) Tommy Byrne (United States) Richard Millman (United States) Tony Kester (United States) Michael Collucci	Porsche 3.6 L Flat-6	D	37
78 DNF	GTS	76	(United States) Gunnar Racing	(United States) Gunnar Jeannette (United States) Wayne Jackson (United States) Paul Newman (United States) Mike Brockman	Porsche 911 GT1 Evo	D	37
78 DNF	GTS	76	(United States) Gunnar Racing	(United States) Gunnar Jeannette (United States) Wayne Jackson (United States) Paul Newman (United States) Mike Brockman	Porsche 3.6 L Turbo Flat-6	D	37
79 DNF	SRP	95	(United States) TRV Motorsports	(United States) Jeret Schroeder (United States) Tom Volk (United States) John Mirro (United States) Barry Waddell	Riley & Scott Mk III	G	3
79 DNF	SRP	95	(United States) TRV Motorsports	(United States) Jeret Schroeder (United States) Tom Volk (United States) John Mirro (United States) Barry Waddell	Chevrolet 5.0 L V8	G	3
DNS	SRP II	49	(United States) Pilbeam Racing America	(United States) Phil Harris	Pilbeam MP84	A	-
DNS	SRP II	49	(United States) Pilbeam Racing America	(United States) Phil Harris	Nissan 3.0 L V6	A	-
