= Alvan Feinstein =

American epidemiologist (1925–2001)

- Born: December 4, 1925; Philadelphia, Pennsylvania, US
- Died: October 25, 2001 (aged 75); Toronto, Ontario, Canada
- Known for: clinical epidemiology clinimetrics

Academic background
- Education: University of Chicago

Alvan R. Feinstein (December 4, 1925 – October 25, 2001) was an American clinician, health informatician, and epidemiologist who had a significant impact on clinical investigation, especially in the field of clinical epidemiology that he helped define. He is regarded as one of the fathers of modern clinical epidemiology.

== Education and career ==
Feinstein was born in Philadelphia, Feinstein received his bachelor's degree (BSc 1947) and master's degree (MSc, 1948) in mathematics at the University of Chicago. Feinstein received his medical degree (MD, 1952) at the University of Chicago School of Medicine. He completed his residency training in Internal Medicine at Rockefeller Institute. He was Board Certified in Internal Medicine in 1955 and became the medical director of Irvington House Institute). While there, he studied patients with rheumatic fever and challenged the belief that proper treatment after an early diagnosis kept those patients from developing severe heart disease later in life. He demonstrated that the disease had different forms including one which causes joint pain and seldom progresses to heart disease. The other, which does result in heart disease, has no symptoms to evoke early detection. Thus, diagnosis of the disease at an early stage leads to a favorable outcome not because of early treatment but because those patients tend to have a less-virulent form.

In 1962, Feinstein joined the Yale University School of Medicine faculty and became the founding director of its Robert Wood Johnson Clinical Scholars Program in 1974. Under his direction, the program became recognized as one of the leading centers for training in clinical research methods. He was widely known for his gift for mentoring, bringing passion to academic medicine and the art of becoming an academic.

He published his first paper as a medical student in 1951 and more than 400 throughout his career. He wrote six major textbooks, two of which, Clinical Judgment (1967) and Clinical Epidemiology: The Architecture of Clinical Research (1985) are among the most widely referenced books in clinical epidemiology. He completed the last one, Principles of Medical Statistics (2002), just before his death. At the time of his death he was the Sterling Professor of Medicine and Epidemiology, the Yale School of Medicine's most prestigious academic position. His editorial work included founding the Journal of Chronic Diseases (1982–1988) which he edited and which he along with co-editor Walter O. Spitzer re-titled as Journal of Clinical Epidemiology, which he continued to co-edit with Spitzer until his death. He died in 2001 of a heart attack.

== Awards and honors ==
During his career, Feinstein garnered numerous recognitions and awards; including the Francis Gilman Blake Award as outstanding teacher to Yale medical students (1969), Richard and Hinda Rosenthal Foundation Award from the American College of Physicians (1982), Robert J. Glaser Annual Award from the Society for General Internal Medicine (1987), J. Allyn Taylor International Prize in Medicine (1987), Gairdner Foundation International Award (1993), and an honorary Doctor of Science degree from McGill University (1997). In 1991, Feinstein was named the Sterling Professor of Medicine and Epidemiology, Yale University's most prestigious academic honor.

In 2002 the American College of Physicians established the Alvan R. Feinstein Memorial Award, which is awarded every other year. The award is "given to an American physician who has made a major contribution to the science of patient care in activities that Dr. Feinstein has broadly defined as clinical epidemiology or clinimetrics, involving the direct study of patients' clinical conditions."

== Relationship with the tobacco industry ==
In his later years, controversy marred his career with claims that he may have aided the tobacco industry by publishing articles minimizing the deleterious effects of smoking. He was funded by the Council for Tobacco Research, established by the tobacco industry to attack scientific studies that put tobacco in a bad light, as early as 1964.

A review of Feinstein's publications in 2002 concluded that "perhaps in hindsight Feinstein could be criticized for not having clearly indicated the sponsorship of the tobacco industry behind these publications, of which he was fully aware. However, this does not suffice to infer that he was the tobacco industry's man. Feinstein's attitude in matters of publication appears balanced". However, this review itself, an invited article written soon after Feinstein's death and published in the Journal of Clinical Epidemiology, may not be unbiased. For the fourteen years preceding his death, Feinstein was Editor-in-Chief of this journal. Still, during those years from 1988 through 2001, he authored only one publication in that journal concerning smoking or tobacco, and only then tangentially. Yacht and Bialous claim a commentary Feinstein published in 1992 in Toxicologic Pathology defended the tobacco industry but failed to mentioned he received grant funding from the tobacco industry. The commentary was in fact published to accompany an original study report in that journal authored by three researchers who listed their institution as "R. J. Reynolds Tobacco Company, Research & Development, Bowman Gray Technical Center." and appeared in the 2-1/2 pages immediately following the report. While the brief defense of the authors' right to publish never mentioned Feinstein's own tobacco industry sponsorship, he made his position clear in the brief piece which ended with "The 'bad guys,' of course, are not always right, but if they are denied a fair and proper scientific hearing, neither society nor science will benefit. Society is entitled to make political decisions based on advocacy. The scientific basis for those decisions, however, should depend not on political advocacy, but on scholarship-no matter how it is produced or by whom."
