= Paul Emery (rheumatologist) =

British rheumatologist and academic

Paul Emery CBE FLSW FRCP FRCPE FMedSci
- Education: Cardiff High School, (Note: He was a Head boy at Cardiff High School) Churchill College, Cambridge
- Occupations: Rheumatologist, researcher, academic
- Years active: 1977–present
- Medical career
- Profession: Arthritis Professor of Rheumatology (Leeds) UK, Head of Rheumatology Department (Leeds); 1995-2017 Director (NIHR Leeds Biomedical Research Centre) 2008-2022; Head of Academic Unit of Musculoskeletal Disease and Lead Clinician of Rheumatology (Leeds Teaching Hospital Trust) 1994-2017
- Institutions: Guy’s Hospital/Brompton Hospital (1977-1980); Guy’s/Brighton/Lewisham 1980-1985; Walter & Eliza Hall Institute, Australia (1985-1987) (Note: Head of Rheumatology Unit); Royal Melbourne Hospital, Australia (1985-1987); University of Birmingham (1988-1995) (Note: Senior Lecturer Rheumatology); University of Leeds (1995-present) (Note: Arthritis Research UK Professor of Rheumatology); Leeds Teaching Hospital Trust (1995-present) (Note: Lead Clinician Rheumatology (1997-2005), Clinical Director Rheumatology (2000- 2018), Director of the Leeds Musculoskeletal Biomedical Research Centre 2008-2022)
- Awards: Roche Biennial Award for Clinical Rheumatology (1991); Hospital Doctor of the Year Rheumatology (1999); EULAR Prize for outstanding contribution to Rheumatology (2002); NIHR Senior Investigator NMR (2009); Carol Nachman Award for Rheumatology (2012) (Note: "In honour of his outstanding innovative research work in the field of rheumatology"); The World’s Most Influential Scientific Minds (2015); Highly Cited Researcher in Clinical Medicine (2015) (Note: Under Clinical Medicine. Highly Cited Researcher according to Thompson Reuters.); Highly Cited Researcher (2017) (Note: According to Web of Science); OBE (2018); Master of the American College of Rheumatology (2018); Meritorious Service Award from EULAR (2020); CBE (2024) APLA Masters Award 2005

Academic work
- Main interests: Rheumatoid arthritis (RA), psoriatic arthritis (PsA), psoriatic disease, connective tissue diseases, prevention of autoimmune diseases, factors leading to persistent inflammation, Scleroderma, Sjogren Syndrome, immunopathogenesis, immunotherapy, disease prevention, ultrasound, MRI imaging

Paul Emery is a British rheumatologist, researcher, and academic. Emery is the Arthritis Professor of Rheumatology at the University of Leeds from 1995 to present, (Note: formerly "Arthritis Research Campaign Professor") Head of its Rheumatology Department from 1995 to 2008. He is Head of the Academic Unit of Musculoskeletal Disease and Lead Clinician of Rheumatology at the Leeds Teaching Hospital NHS Trust, and was the Director of the NIHR Leeds Biomedical Research Centre from 2009 to 2022. He is known for introducing early intervention in inflammatory arthritis. Emery played a critical role in bringing sensitive imaging (MRI and Ultrsound) into rheumatology practice. In 2012, Emery was awarded the Carol Nachman Prize for Rheumatology, and as of 2026, he has published over 1660 peer-reviewed articles with over 16,000 citations. Emery was the most cited European/World Rheumatologist in 2010-2020, and was selected in the European Journal of Clinical Investigation's "list of highly influential biomedical researchers, 1996–2020."

== Early life and education ==
Emery attended Cardiff High School from 1963 to 1971 (Head Boy) and graduated from Churchill College, Cambridge in 1974. He received his clinical training at Guy's Hospital and at Royal Brompton Hospital was accredited in rheumatology and general internal medicine in 1984.

== Career ==
Emery worked at Guys Hospital from 1977 to 1985 and as House Officer to Senior Registrar and at Royal Brompton Hospital.

In 1985 Emery became Head of Rheumatology at the Walter and Eliza Hall Institute, and a consultant at the Royal Melbourne Hospital.

In 1988 Emery became a Senior Lecturer at the University of Birmingham.

Emery has been the Arthritis Research UK Professor of Rheumatology at the University of Leeds since 1995.

Emery was inaugural President of the International extremity MRI society (ISEMIR).

Emery has been a senior investigator at the National Institute for Health and Care Research since 2008.

From 2009 to 2011 Emery was President of the European Alliance of Associations for Rheumatology (EULAR).

In 2010 he ranked first as the most cited European Rheumatologist with 16,952 citations, according to Lab Times.

In 2013 Boyack et al. published "A list of highly influential biomedical researchers, 1996–2011." in the European Journal of Clinical Investigation. They selected Emery among 532 authors who belonged to the 400 researchers with highest total citation count (25,142 or more citations). As of the time of publishing the list, Emery had 657 papers published with 30,096 citations.

Emery was inaugural chair of FOREUM Executive, the European Foundation for Research in Rheumatology, from 2013 to 2019. Emery is currently a member of the Board of Trustees.

In 2015, Emery was elected a Fellow of the Academy of Medical Sciences.

In 2017 Emery ranked first as the most cited European Rheumatologist with 20,223 citations, according to Lab Times. Emery was ranked among the world’s top 0.1% of Rheumatoid Arthritis experts by Expertscape in 2020.

Emery was appointed Officer of the Order of the British Empire (OBE) in 2018 by the Queen and Commander of the Order of the British Empire (CBE) in the 2024 New Year Honours by the King for services to rheumatology.

In 2021 Emery became a Fellow of the Learned Society of Wales (FLSW).

== Bibliography ==
=== Books ===
- Rheumatoid Arthritis: An Overview (2008) ISBN 9789814206464
- Pocket Reference to Early Rheumatoid Arthritis (2011) ISBN 9781908517227
- Atlas of Rheumatoid Arthritis (2015) ISBN 9781907673917 (Note: And a further 89 books.)

=== Select publications ===
- Gough, Andrew KS, P. Emery, R. L. Holder, J. Lilley, and S. Eyre. "Generalised bone loss in patients with early rheumatoid arthritis." The Lancet 344, no. 8914 (1994): 23-27. doi:10.1016/S0140-6736(94)91049-9
- McGonagle, Dennis, Wayne Gibbon, and Paul Emery. "Classification of inflammatory arthritis by enthesitis." The Lancet 352, no. 9134 (1998): 1137-1140. doi:10.1016/S0140-6736(97)12004-9
- McGonagle, Dennis, Wayne Gibbon, Philip O'Connor, Michael Green, Colin Pease, John Ridgway, and Paul Emery. "An anatomical explanation for good-prognosis rheumatoid arthritis." The Lancet 353, no. 9147 (1999): 123-124. doi:10.1016/S0140-6736(05)76160-2
- Paul Emery, Henning Zeidler, Tore K. Kvien, Mario Guslandi, Raphael Naudin, Helen Stead, Kenneth M. Verburg, Peter C. Isakson, Richard C. Hubbard, and G. Steven Geis. "Celecoxib versus diclofenac in long-term management of rheumatoid arthritis: randomised double-blind comparison." The Lancet 354, no. 9196 (1999): 2106-2111. doi:10.1016/S0140-6736(99)02332-6
- Edwards, Jonathan CW, Leszek Szczepański, Jacek Szechiński, Anna Filipowicz-Sosnowska, Paul Emery, David R. Close, Randall M. Stevens, and Tim Shaw. "Efficacy of B-cell–targeted therapy with rituximab in patients with rheumatoid arthritis." New England Journal of Medicine 350, no. 25 (2004): 2572–2581. doi:10.1056/NEJMoa032534
- Emery, Paul, Ferdinand C. Breedveld, Stephen Hall, Patrick Durez, David J. Chang, Deborah Robertson, Amitabh Singh, Ronald D. Pedersen, Andrew S. Koenig, and Bruce Freundlich. "Comparison of methotrexate monotherapy with a combination of methotrexate and etanercept in active, early, moderate to severe rheumatoid arthritis (COMET): a randomised, double-blind, parallel treatment trial." The Lancet 372, no. 9636 (2008): 375-382. doi:10.1016/S0140-6736(08)61000-4
- Emery, Paul, Mohammed Hammoudeh, Oliver FitzGerald, Bernard Combe, Emilio Martin-Mola, Maya H. Buch, Marek Krogulec et al. "Sustained remission with etanercept tapering in early rheumatoid arthritis." New England Journal of Medicine 371, no. 19 (2014): 1781-1792. doi:10.1056/NEJMoa1316133
- Tuttle, Jay, Edit Drescher, Jesus Abraham Simón-Campos, Paul Emery, Maria Greenwald, Alan Kivitz, Hyungmin Rha, Pia Yachi, Christina Kiley, and Ajay Nirula. "A Phase 2 Trial of Peresolimab for Adults with Rheumatoid Arthritis." New England Journal of Medicine 388, no. 20 (2023): 1853-1862. doi:10.1056/NEJMoa2209856
- Duquenne, Laurence, Elizabeth M. Hensor, Michelle Wilson, Leticia Garcia-Montoya, Jacqueline L. Nam, Jianhua Wu, Kate Harnden, Anioke IC, Di Matteo A, Chowdhury R, Sidhu N, Ponchel F, Mankia K, Emery P. "Predicting Inflammatory Arthritis in At-Risk Persons: Development of Scores for Risk Stratification." Annals of Internal Medicine 176, no. 8 (2023): 1027-1036. doi:10.7326/M23-0272
- Di Matteo A, Bathon Joan A., Emery P. Rheumatoid arthritis. The Lancet (2023) doi:10.1016/S0140-6736(23)01525-8
