= Campbell Collaboration =

Nonprofit organization aimed at evaluating effects of social interventions

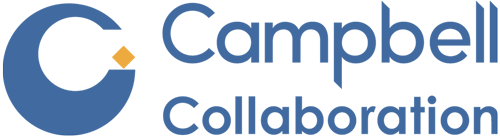
- Founded: 2000
- Type: International research network
- Purpose: Research evidence synthesis for decisionmaking in policy and practice
- Region served: Global
- Products: Systematic reviews; Plain language summaries; Policy briefs; Evidence and gap maps; Evidence synthesis methods papers
- Website: https://campbellcollaboration.org/

The Campbell Collaboration is a non-profit organisation that promotes evidence-based decisions and policy through the production of systematic reviews and other types of evidence synthesis. Campbell is composed of coordinating groups that coordinate the production of systematic reviews and evidence gap maps in the following areas: Ageing, Business & Management, Children & Young Persons Wellbeing, Climate Solutions, Crime & Justice, Disability, Education, Sustainable Development, Knowledge Translation & Implementation, Methods and Social Welfare. It is a sister initiative of Cochrane. The CEO is Will Moy, who was formerly Chief Executive of Full Fact. The current president of the board of directors is David Myers, former CEO of the American Institutes for Research.

Campbell reviews are published in Campbell Systematic Reviews, an open access journal committed to publishing systematic reviews as well as methods research papers, and evidence and gap maps. The Editor-In-Chief is Vivian Welch from the University of Ottawa.

== History ==
The Campbell Collaboration was created as a result of a perceived need for an organization that would produce reviews of the evidence on the effectiveness of social interventions. An exploratory meeting in London in 1999 led to the establishment of the Campbell Collaboration in 2000 and an inaugural meeting at the University of Pennsylvania in Philadelphia, United States, on 24–25 February 2000.

The collaboration was named after the American psychologist Donald T. Campbell (1916–1996), a member of the National Academy of Sciences in the United States.

In December 2004, the American Psychological Association published an article on the work of the Campbell Collaboration.

In May 2005, a special issue of the Annals of the American Academy of Political and Social Science was devoted to describing what the evidence-based approach of the Cochrane Collaboration and Campbell Collaboration had uncovered.

The International Initiative for Impact Evaluation (3ie) and the University of Ottawa established the International Development Coordinating Group (IDCG) in May 2011.

There are two Campbell regional centres: Campbell UK & Ireland, established in 2016 and hosted at The Centre for Evidence and Social Innovation at Queen's University Belfast in the UK, and Campbell South Asia, established in New Delhi, India in 2019. An external affiliated organization called the Campbell China Network in November 2019 as a part of Campbell's strategy to "go East" in 2019–2022.

== Use by other organisations and policy influence ==
Campbell reviews are used by organisations and policymakers to inform decision-making based on research evidence. Charity evaluator and effective altruism advocate GiveWell had listed the Campbell Collaboration as one of its sources of information when trying to assess the state of evidence for various social policies and interventions in the United States and notes their value in determining susceptibility to publication bias of social programmes. Campbell reviews have been used to inform policy implementation and guideline development in various countries.

== Affiliations ==
=== Sponsors ===
The Campbell Collaboration has been sponsored by a number of public and private donors, including foundations and government agencies.

- American Institutes for Research
- Canadian Department of Justice
- Ewing Marion Kauffman Foundation
- Hewlett Foundation
- Jacobs Foundation
- Jerry Lee Foundation
- Knight Foundation
- National Centre for Policing Excellence
- National Institute for Justice
- Nordic Council of Ministers
- Norwegian Directorate for Health and Social Affairs
- Norwegian Institute of Public Health
- Ministry of Education and Research (Norway)
- Queen’s University Belfast
- Robert Wood Johnson Foundation
- Rockefeller Foundation
- Smith Richardson Foundation
- Swedish National Board of Health and Welfare
- UK Home Office
- UNICEF
- University of Pennsylvania
- United States Department of Education

=== Partnerships ===
The Campbell Collaboration partners with similar organizations worldwide.

- Cochrane
- Evidence for Policy and Practice Information and Co-ordinating Centre (EPPI-Centre)
- The International Center for Evaluation and Development (ICED)
- International Initiative for Impact Evaluation (3ie)
- Jerry Lee Center of Criminology, University of Pennsylvania
- Joanna Briggs Institute
- Lanzhou University’s Evidence Based Medicine Center in China
- Norwegian Institute of Public Health

== Similar organizations ==
- Cochrane Collaboration
- Coalition for Evidence-Based Policy
- Laura and John Arnold Foundation
- What Works Clearinghouse
- GiveWell
