= Outcome Measures in Rheumatology =

Rheumatology initiative

OMERACT
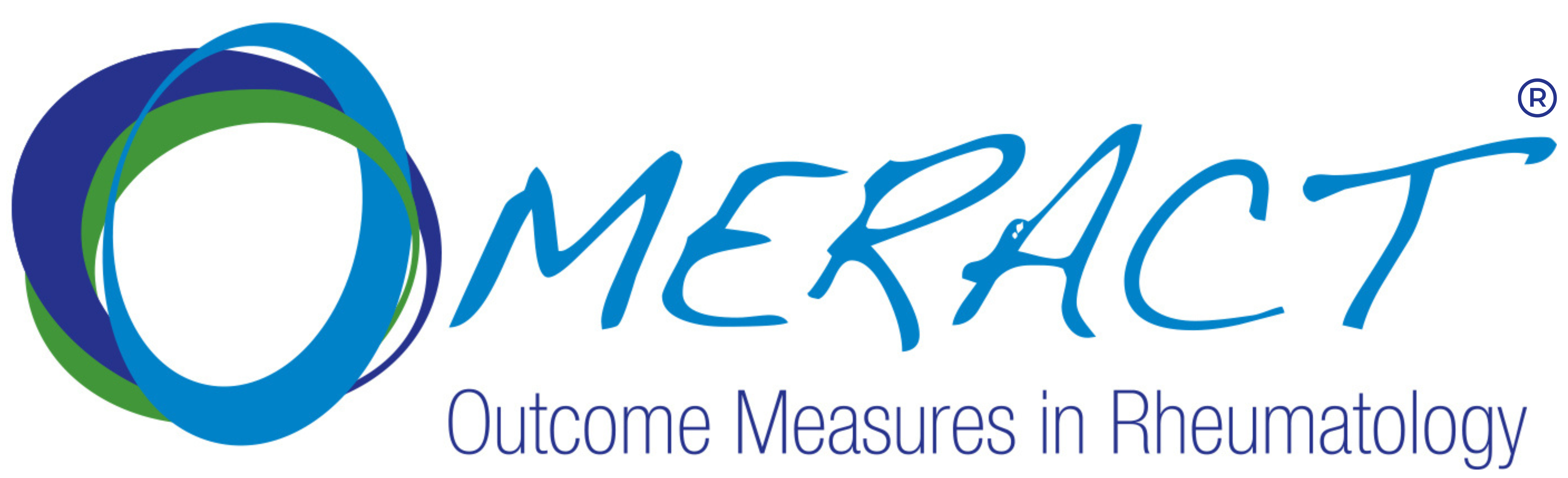
- The OMERACT logo used since 2012

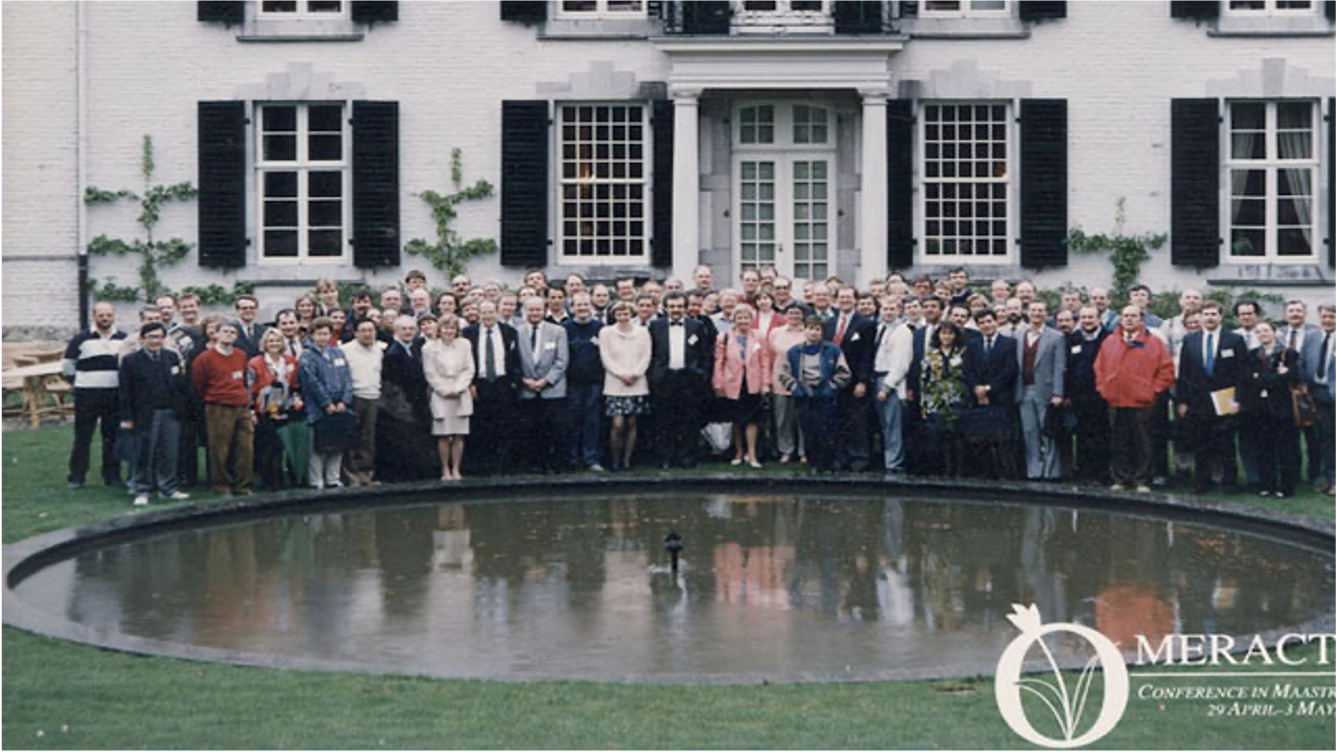
- Group photo of attendees at the inaugural OMERACT conference held in Maastricht, The Netherlands, from April 29 to May 3, 1992
- Formerly: Outcome Measures in Rheumatoid Arthritis Clinical Trials (1992–1996)
- Industry: Medical Research
- Founded: April 29, 1992; 34 years ago in Ottawa, Ontario, Canada
- Founders: Dr. Maarten Boers; Dr. Peter Brooks; Dr. Peter Tugwell; Dr. Vibeke Strand
- Key people: Dr. Peter Tugwell, Chair; Dr. Dorcas Beaton, Chair - Methods; Dr. Philip Conaghan, Deputy Chair; Catherine Hofstetter, Chair - Patient Research Partners; Dr. Lee Simon, Chair - Finances
- Website: www.omeract.org

Outcome Measures in Rheumatology (OMERACT) is an international initiative aimed at improving outcome measurement in rheumatology. Established in 1992, OMERACT organizes biennial consensus conferences to develop and refine core sets of measures for rheumatologic conditions, with an emphasis on data-driven recommendations....

== Founding and organization ==
OMERACT was initiated by Dr. Peter Tugwell and Dr. Maarten Boers, who observed discrepancies in outcome measures between European and North American rheumatoid arthritis clinical trials. The first conference was held in Maastricht, the Netherlands, in 1992. The initiative was originally chaired by 4 member executive committee consisting of Dr. Maarten Boers, Dr. Peter Brooks, Dr. Peter Tugwell, and Dr. Vibeke Strand.

== Mission and activities ==
OMERACT's mission is to improve endpoint outcome measurement through an iterative, data-driven process. The key activities include:

- Organizing consensus conferences every two years.
- Engaging stakeholders including patients since 2002
- Developing and updating core sets of measures for rheumatologic conditions.

== Impact and achievements ==
OMERACT has achieved consensus on Core Outcome Sets for conditions such as rheumatoid arthritis, osteoarthritis, and osteoporosis. The measures endorsed by OMERACT are widely adopted in clinical trials and systematic reviews, contributing to standardization in the field. OMERACT’s methodology has been emulated in other medical fields and international collaborations

== Governance and funding ==
OMERACT operates as a registered not-for-profit organization in Canada
