= Vivian Welch =

Canadian clinical epidemiology methodologist

Academic background
- Education: BSc, Exercise Science, 1992, Concordia University; MSc, Exercise and Health Science, 1994, York University; PhD, 2010, University of Ottawa
- Thesis: What is the role of systematic reviews in tackling health inequity? (2010)

Academic work
- Institutions: Bruyère Research Institute

Vivian Andrea Welch (née Robinson) is a Canadian clinical epidemiology methodologist and population health researcher. She is an associate professor at the University of Ottawa's School of Epidemiology and Public Health and Editor in Chief of the Campbell Collaboration.

== Early life and education ==
Welch earned her Bachelor of Science degree from Concordia University before moving to Ontario for her Master's degree from York University and PhD from the University of Ottawa under Peter Tugwell. While attending Concordia, she received The Francis J. Dowling Scholarship in athletic therapy and was named to the Faculty of Arts and Science Dean's List.

== Career ==
Upon completing her PhD, Welch joined the faculty at the University of Ottawa's Bruyère Research Institute (BRI) as their deputy director. While serving in this role, she also became the co-convenor of the Campbell and Cochrane Equity Methods Group. In 2016, Welch was appointed the co-manager of a data research program at the BRI to conduct research that describes, evaluates, and improves care for Ontario's ageing population. She was also the Principal investigator of a study that found that mass deworming campaigns had little effect on children’s health in low- and middle-income countries.

As a result of her academic accomplishments, Welch was appointed the inaugural Editor in Chief of the Campbell Collaboration and recognized as a Canadian leader in global health. In 2019, Welch was promoted from assistant professor to associate professor in the School of Epidemiology and Public Health.
