= Hal Blumenfeld =

American neuroscientist (born 1962)

- Born: March 28, 1962 (age 64); California
- Education: Harvard University Columbia University
- Occupations: Professor of Neurology, Neuroscience, and Neurosurgery
- Years active: 25
- Known for: Consciousness Research in Epilepsy
- Medical career
- Field: Neuroscience, Neurology
- Institutions: Yale University School of Medicine Massachusetts General Hospital/Harvard Medical School Columbia Presbyterian Medical Center
- Awards: Research Recognition Award, Clinical Science, American Epilepsy Society (2017) Javits Neuroscience Investigator Award, National Institute of Neurological Disorders and Stroke (2017) Mark Loughridge and Michele Williams Professorship, Yale University School of Medicine (2015 - ) Yale Graduate Mentor Award (2015). Visiting Professor, Xiangya School of Medicine, Changsha, Hunan, China (2015-2020).

Hal Blumenfeld (born March 28, 1962) is a professor of neurology, neuroscience, and neurosurgery at Yale University. His focus is on brain mechanisms of consciousness and on altered consciousness in epilepsy. As director of the Yale Clinical Neuroscience Imaging Center, he leads multi-disciplinary research and is also well known for his teaching contributions in neuroanatomy and clinical neuroscience.

== Biography ==
Blumenfeld was born in California, grew up in New York, and began his career in Bio-electrical Engineering at Harvard University (1984). His passion for science would lead him to Columbia University, where, working with Eric Kandel and Steven Siegelbaum, he obtained his PhD (1990) in Physiology and Cellular Biophysics and his MD (1992). He completed his internal medicine internship at Columbia Presbyterian Medical Center(1993) and entered the field of neurology, completing a three-year residency program at Massachusetts General Hospital in Boston (1996). He then completed his fellowship at Yale University's School of Medicine.

== Career ==
Blumenfeld dedicated his professional career to studying brain networks in various types of seizures as well as normal brain function. Using multiple modalities of brain imaging in humans and animal models, his research has made significant contributions towards determining why children with absence seizures become unconscious.

Through active collaborations with Fahmeed Hyder (also at Yale), Blumenfeld's direct recordings of the electrical activity of brain cells improved the analysis of indirect neuroimaging measurements of brain functions, utilizing fMRI.

Blumenfeld is the author of the textbook Neuroanatomy through Clinical Cases. The textbook is used in over half the medical schools in the United States and throughout the world.

== Awards ==
- 2017 - Javits Neuroscience Investigator Award, National Institute of Neurological Disorders and Stroke
- 2017 - Clinical Science Research Award, American Epilepsy Society
- 2015 - Graduate Mentor Award, Yale University
- 2007 - Francis Gilman Blake Award, Yale University, School of Medicine
- 2005 - Dreifuss-Penry Epilepsy Research Award, American Academy of Neurology

== Publications ==
=== Books ===
- Blumenfeld, H. (2021). Neuroanatomy through Clinical Cases, 3rd Ed. Sinauer Associates/Oxford University Press.
- Cavanna, A.E., Nani, A., Blumenfeld, H., Laureys, S. [Eds.] (2013). Neuroimaging of Consciousness. Springer.
- Faingold, C., Blumenfeld, H. [Eds.] (2014). Neuronal Networks in Brain Function, CNS Disorders, and Therapeutics. Elsevier ISBN 9780124158641.

=== Articles ===
- X Herman W, Smith RE, Kronemer SI, Watsky RE, Chen WC, M Gober L, Touloumes GJ, Khosla M, Raja A, Horien CL, C Morse E, L Botta K, Hirsch LJ, Alkawadri R, Gerrard JL, Spencer DD, Blumenfeld H:A Switch and Wave of Neuronal Activity in the Cerebral Cortex During the First Second of Conscious Perception. Cereb Cortex. 2017 Nov. PMID 29194517
- Guo JN, Kim R, Chen Y, Negishi M, Jhun S, Weiss S, Ryu JH, Bai X, Xiao W, Feeney E, Rodriguez-Fernandez J, Mistry H, Crunelli V, Crowley MJ, Mayes LC, Constable RT, Blumenfeld H: Impaired consciousness in patients with absence seizures investigated by functional MRI, EEG, and behavioural measures: a cross-sectional study. Lancet Neurol. 2016 Dec. PMID 27839650
- Kundishora AJ, Gummadavelli A, Ma C, Liu M, McCafferty C, Schiff ND, Willie JT, Gross RE, Gerrard J, Blumenfeld H: Restoring Conscious Arousal During Focal Limbic Seizures with Deep Brain Stimulation. Cereb Cortex. 2016 Mar 3; 2016 Mar 3. PMID 26941379
- Zhan Q, Buchanan GF, Motelow JE, Andrews J, Vitkovskiy P, Chen WC, Serout F, Gummadavelli A, Kundishora A, Furman M, Li W, Bo X, Richerson GB, Blumenfeld H: Impaired Serotonergic Brainstem Function during and after Seizures. J Neurosci. 2016 Mar 2. PMID 26937010
- Motelow JE, Li W, Zhan Q, Mishra AM, Sachdev RN, Liu G, Gummadavelli A, Zayyad Z, Lee HS, Chu V, Andrews JP, Englot DJ, Herman P, Sanganahalli BG, Hyder F, Blumenfeld H: Decreased subcortical cholinergic arousal in focal seizures. Neuron. 2015 Feb 4. PMID 25654258
- Bailey CJ, Sanganahalli BG, Herman P, Blumenfeld H, Gjedde A, Hyder F: Analysis of time and space invariance of BOLD responses in the rat visual system. Cereb Cortex. 2013 Jan; 2012 Jan 31. PMID 22298731
- Blumenfeld H. (2012). Impaired consciousness in epilepsy. The Lancet Neurology, 11: 814–826.
- Mishra AM, Ellens DJ, Schridde U, Motelow JE, Purcaro MJ, DeSalvo MN, Enev M, Sanganahalli BG, Hyder F, Blumenfeld H: Where fMRI and electrophysiology agree to disagree: corticothalamic and striatal activity patterns in the WAG/Rij rat. J Neurosci. 2011 Oct 19. PMID 22016539
- Englot DJ, Yang L, Hamid H, Danielson N, Bai X, Marfeo A, Yu L, Gordon A, Purcaro MJ, Motelow JE, Agarwal R, Ellens DJ, Golomb JD, Shamy MC, Zhang H, Carlson C, Doyle W, Devinsky O, Vives K, Spencer DD, Spencer SS, Schevon C, Zaveri HP, Blumenfeld H: Impaired consciousness in temporal lobe seizures: role of cortical slow activity. Brain. 2010 Dec; 2010 Nov 16. PMID 21081551
- Bai X, Vestal M, Berman R, Negishi M, Spann M, Vega C, Desalvo M, Novotny EJ, Constable RT, Blumenfeld H: Dynamic time course of typical childhood absence seizures: EEG, behavior, and functional magnetic resonance imaging. J Neurosci. 2010 Apr 28. PMID 20427649
- Englot DJ, Modi B, Mishra AM, DeSalvo M, Hyder F, Blumenfeld H: Cortical deactivation induced by subcortical network dysfunction in limbic seizures. J Neurosci. 2009 Oct 14. PMID 19828814
- Blumenfeld H, Varghese GI, Purcaro MJ, Motelow JE, Enev M, McNally KA, Levin AR, Hirsch LJ, Tikofsky R, Zubal IG, Paige AL, Spencer SS: Cortical and subcortical networks in human secondarily generalized tonic-clonic seizures. Brain. 2009 Apr; 2009 Apr 1. PMID 19339252
- Schridde U, Khubchandani M, Motelow JE, Sanganahalli BG, Hyder F, Blumenfeld H: Negative BOLD with large increases in neuronal activity. Cereb Cortex. 2008 Aug; 2007 Dec 5. PMID 18063563
- Blumenfeld H, Klein JP, Schridde U, Vestal M, Rice T, Khera DS, Bashyal C, Giblin K, Paul-Laughinghouse C, Wang F, Phadke A, Mission J, Agarwal RK, Englot DJ, Motelow J, Nersesyan H, Waxman SG, Levin AR: Early treatment suppresses the development of spike-wave epilepsy in a rat model. Epilepsia. 2008 Mar; 2007 Dec 6. PMID 18070091
- Blumenfeld H, McNally KA, Vanderhill SD, Paige AL, Chung R, Davis K, Norden AD, Stokking R, Studholme C, Novotny EJ Jr, Zubal IG, Spencer SS: Positive and negative network correlations in temporal lobe epilepsy. Cereb Cortex. 2004 Aug; 2004 Apr 14. PMID 15084494
