= Robert A. Chase =

American surgeon (1923–2024)

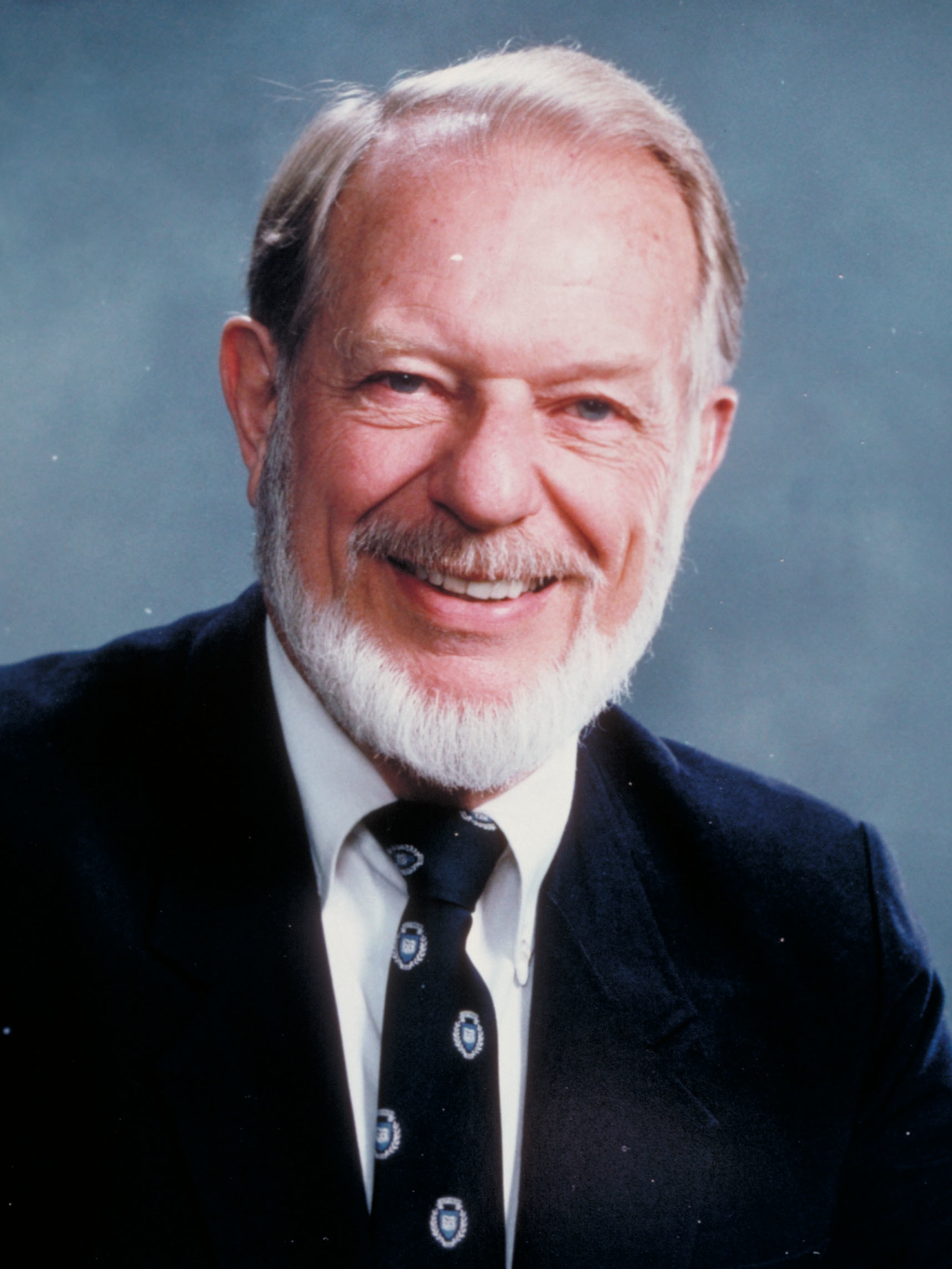
- Born: Robert Arthur Chase; January 6, 1923; Keene, New Hampshire, U.S.
- Died: September 9, 2024 (aged 101); California
- Education: Bachelor of Science, University of New Hampshire, 1945; M.D. from Yale University, 1947
- Occupations: Surgeon Surgery residency, Yale University, (1947-1953); Plastic and reconstructive surgery fellowship, University of Pittsburgh, (1957-1958); Assistant Professor and Associate Professor, Yale University, (1959-1962; 1962); Professor and Chairman of Surgery at the Stanford University School of Medicine; first Emile Holman Professor of Surgery (1963-1974); Acting Chairman of the Department of Anatomy at Stanford University, 1973. President and Director of the National Board of Medical Examiners in Philadelphia, 1974-1977. Chief of the Division of Human Anatomy, Stanford University, until 1992.
- Spouse: Ann Parker Chase (married 1946; died 2013)
- Children: 3
- Awards: Francis Gilman Blake Award at Yale University; 8 Teaching awards at Stanford University

Robert Arthur Chase (January 6, 1923 – September 9, 2024) was an American surgeon, researcher, and medical educator. He specialized in limb reconstruction and contributed to the development of hand surgery. In 1985, he founded the Division of Hand Surgery at Stanford University School of Medicine.

== Early life and education ==
Chase was born in Keene, New Hampshire, on January 6, 1923. During his youth, he worked at a family general store. He earned a Bachelor of Science degree from the University of New Hampshire in 1945 and an M.D. from Yale University in 1947.

== Early career ==
Chase was commissioned as an officer in the U.S. Army in 1949 during his surgical residency. He returned to complete his residency at Yale University in 1953 and was then assigned as the Chief of Surgery at the U.S. Army Hospital in Leghorn, Italy.

After his service, Chase specialized in plastic and reconstructive surgery at the University of Pittsburgh. In 1957, he joined Yale's surgical faculty and established Yale's first plastic surgery division. In 1959, he was appointed Assistant Professor at Yale and promoted to Associate Professor in 1962. He was appointed Professor and Chairman of Surgery at the Stanford University School of Medicine in 1963. At Stanford, Chase helped develop an integrated program that combined general and plastic surgery training, which preceded the establishment of Stanford's Division of Plastic and Reconstructive Surgery.

== Later life and legacy ==
In 1973, Chase was appointed acting Chairman of the Department of Anatomy at Stanford University. From 1974 to 1977, he served as president and Director of the National Board of Medical Examiners in Philadelphia.

In 1977, Chase returned to Stanford and assumed the position of Chief of the Division of Human Anatomy until 1992. In 1988, he was also named Professor of Surgery, Emeritus and continued teaching human anatomy after retiring from full-time faculty duties.

His honors included the Francis Gilman Blake Award from Yale University, several teaching awards at Stanford, the Pettee Award from the University of New Hampshire, the Albion Walter Hewlett Award from the Stanford University School of Medicine, and the Golden Apple Award from the California Medical Association.

Chase authored more than 100 peer-reviewed publications and 35 books, including the Atlas of Hand Surgery.

The Robert A. Chase Library and Museum, located on the ground floor of the American Society for Surgery of the Hand, was named in his honor.

== Personal life and death ==
Chase and his wife, Ann, had three children, nine grandchildren, and seventeen great-grandchildren. Ann died in November 2013.

Chase died on September 9, 2024, at the age of 101.
