= Clinical epidemiology =

Subfield of epidemiology focused on clinical medicine

Clinical epidemiology is a subfield of epidemiology specifically focused on issues relevant to clinical medicine. The term was first introduced by virologist John R. Paul in his presidential address to the American Society for Clinical Investigation in 1938. It is sometimes referred to as "the basic science of clinical medicine".

== Definition ==
When he coined the term clinical epidemiology in 1938, John R. Paul defined it as "a marriage between quantitative concepts used by epidemiologists to study disease in populations and decision-making in the individual case which is the daily fare of clinical medicine". According to Stephenson & Babiker (2000), "Clinical epidemiology can be defined as the investigation and control of the distribution and determinants of disease." Walter O. Spitzer has highlighted the ways in which the field of clinical epidemiology is not clearly defined. However, he felt that, despite criticism of the term, it was a useful way to define a specific subfield of epidemiology. In contrast, John M. Last felt that the term was an oxymoron, and that its increasing popularity in many different medical schools was a serious problem.

Clinical epidemiology aims to optimise the diagnostic, treatment and prevention processes for an individual patient, based on an assessment of the diagnostic and treatment process using epidemiological research data. A central tenet of clinical epidemiology is that every clinical decision must be based on rigorously evidence-based science.

The objectives of clinical epidemiology are primarily to develop epidemiologically sound clinical guidelines and standards for diagnosis, disease progression, prognosis, treatment and prevention. The data obtained in epidemiological studies are also applicable for the epidemiological justification of preventive programmes for communicable and noncommunicable diseases.

There are various types of epidemiological studies in use: case-control studies, cohort studies, experimental controlled randomised trials (RCTs). Experimentation, in general, is a general scientific method of testing causal hypotheses by means of an intervention (controlled influence) in the natural course of the phenomenon under study. In order to assess the result of the intervention, the experiment necessarily involves comparable groups - experimental and control, i.e. the study is controlled. The division of patients into groups should be done by randomisation.

A key aspect of clinical epidemiology is the evaluation of the effectiveness of treatment and prevention medicines. The effectiveness of preventive and curative medicines is divided into potential effectiveness (the maximum achievable effect of interventions at a given level of science) and real effectiveness (the effect that is available in practice).

== See also ==
- Journal of Clinical Epidemiology
