= Daniel Aletaha =

Austrian rheumatologist

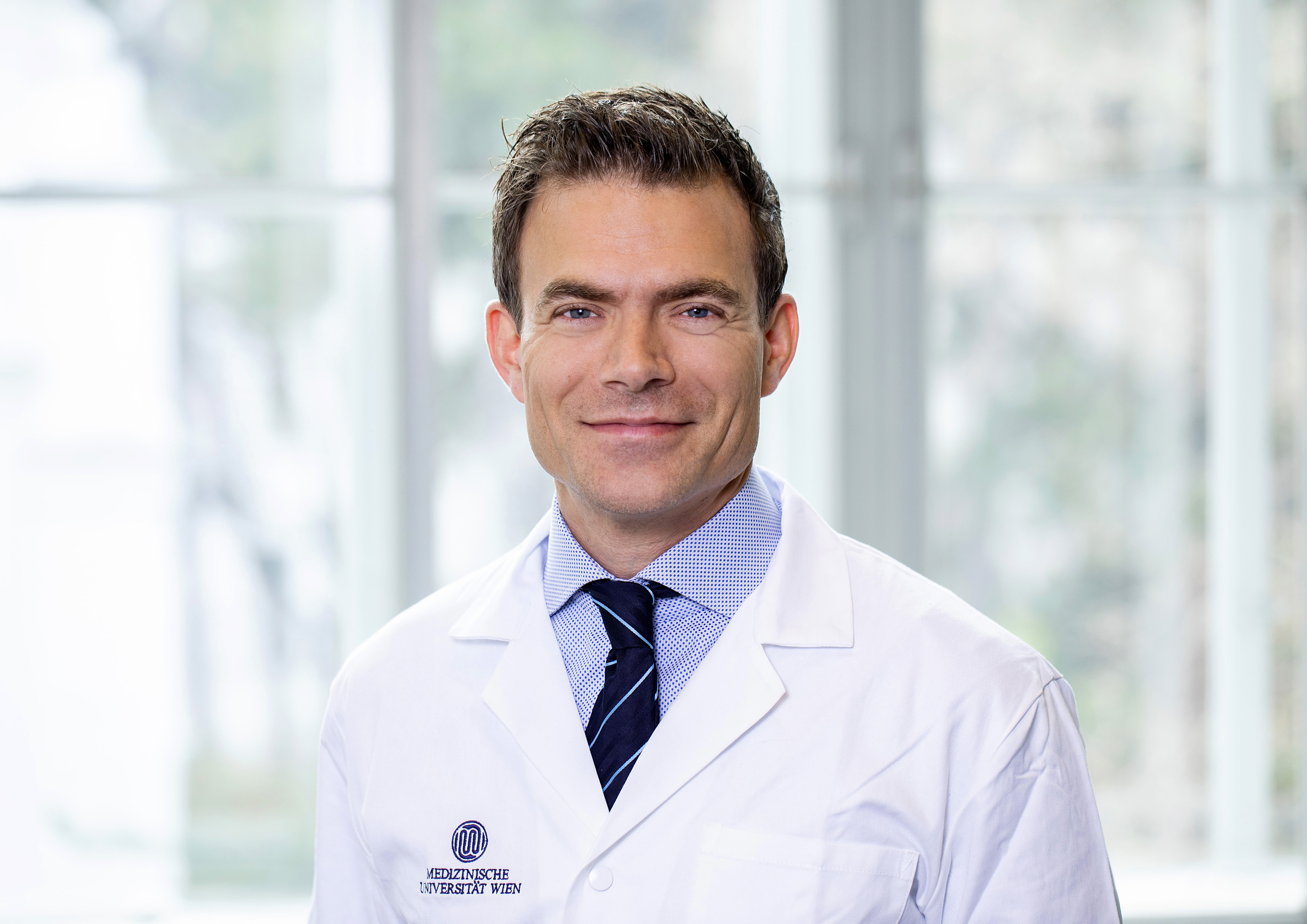
Daniel Aletaha (2019)

Daniel Aletaha (born June 15, 1975 in Vienna) is an Austrian physician and professor of rheumatology. He has been head of the Department of Rheumatology at the Medical University of Vienna since 1 July 2019, and the President of the European Alliance of Associations for Rheumatology (EULAR) since 2023.

== Biography ==
Aletaha studied human medicine at the Medical Faculty of the University of Vienna, obtaining his doctorate in June 1999 and subsequently completing his training as a specialist in internal medicine at the General Hospital of the City of Vienna. This was followed in 2006 by his habilitation in internal medicine with his paper on "Therapy of chronic polyarthritis: strategies and their implementation". Aletaha completed further academic studies as Master of Clinical Sciences (MS, Duke University, Durham, North Carolina, USA; 2006) and Master of Business Administration (MBA, Danube University Krems; 2017). Research visits have taken him to the National Institutes of Health in Bethesda, Maryland, USA, in 2004-2006, among others. Since 2023, Aletaha has been president of EULAR.

In June 2019, he was appointed Professor of Rheumatology, succeeding Josef Smolen, and Head of the Department of Rheumatology at the Medical University of Vienna.

== Publications ==
Aletaha is the author of more than 250 peer-reviewed publications, including in international journals such as The Lancet and Nature Medicine. He is first author of the international classification criteria for rheumatoid arthritis (ACR/EULAR 2010 Classification Criteria for Rheumatoid Arthritis).

== Honors ==
In 2005 and 2006, Aletaha was awarded the Science Prize of the Austrian Society of Rheumatology (ÖGR), followed by the Theodor Billroth Prize of the Austrian Medical Association in 2011. In 2016, Aletaha was appointed Honorary Member of EULAR, and in 2023, was elected President of the same organisation.
