= Francis Gilman Blake =

American immunologist (1887–1952)

- Born: February 22, 1887; Mansfield Valley, Pennsylvania
- Died: February 1, 1952 (aged 64); Washington, D.C.
- Education: Harvard University
- Awards: Medal for Merit in 1946
- Scientific career
- Fields: immunology
- Workplaces: Yale University
- Doctoral students: Thomas Francis Jr.

Francis Gilman Blake (22 February 1887–1 February 1952) was an American immunologist. He served as dean of the Yale University School of Medicine, president of the American Association of Immunologists, and physician-in-chief of the Yale–New Haven Hospital.

== Early life and family ==
Blake was a native of the small Pennsylvania town of Mansfield Valley. His father, a mining engineer, died when he was three years old. He spent much of his childhood in Massachusetts, where he was an enthusiastic observer of nature; at the age of 15, along with one of his brothers, he submitted an ornithological paper which was published in The Auk in 1902. He received his A.B. from Dartmouth in 1908, after which he spent a year as a tutor to save enough money to pay for his further education. He then enrolled in Harvard Medical School, where he received his MD in 1913. While completing his medical internship at Peter Bent Brigham, he met Dorothy P. Dewey, a nurse; they married in 1916 and had three sons. During his time at Harvard, he acquired a deep interest in infectious diseases and applied microbiology, reflecting the influence of Theobald Smith, who Blake much admired.

== Academic career ==
Blake joined the faculty of the University of Minnesota Medical School in 1917, and the Rockefeller Institute of Medical Research in 1919. Also during this time, he accepted a commission with the Medical Reserve Corps, entering as a First Lieutenant in January 1918 and promoting to Captain within three months. He was part of a commission studying the transmission of influenza within army camps, which was a significant problem at the time. He spent 20 months working with Major Russell Cecil at the Army Medical School, primarily on the production and prevention of bacterial pneumonia in monkeys, the result being a series of ten papers in the Journal of Experimental Medicine.

In 1921, he became the John Slade Ely Professor of Medicine at Yale, where he was named Sterling Professor of Medicine in 1927. At the time of his appointment, he was one of the youngest full professors of medicine in Yale's history. He was dean of Yale's medical school from 1940 until 1947. He was the physician-in-chief of Yale-New Haven Hospital for more than thirty years, from 1921 until his death in 1952. He performed significant research in epidemic diseases and some of the first laboratory and clinical tests on penicillin. He was the doctoral advisor of Thomas Francis Jr., who in turn was the advisor of Jonas Salk.

Blake joined the American Association of Immunologists in 1921 and served as its president from 1934 to 1935, after which he was one of its councillors from 1935 to 1939. He was part of the board of editors of The Journal of Immunology from 1936 to 1942, and an associate editor from 1943 to 1952.

== Honors and awards ==
Blake received numerous honors over the course of his career, including the Charles V. Chapin Award (1945), U.S. Typhus Commission Medal (1945), and Medal for Merit (1946). He was made a member of the National Academy of Sciences in 1947 and a fellow in 1948, and became a member of the American Philosophical Society in 1949. His first alma mater, Dartmouth, awarded him an honorary Sc.D. degree in 1936.

== Death and named award ==
In January 1952, Blake took a leave of absence to become the civilian technical director of the U.S. Army's Medical Research and Development Board. He did not hold the position long; at the end of that month he was admitted to Walter Reed Hospital for the treatment of a coronary occlusion, and on 1 February, he died.

After his death, an award was established in his honor. The Francis Gilman Blake Award is an annual award to the Yale medical faculty member designated by the graduating class as the most outstanding teacher. Some of the notable recipients have included Hal Blumenfeld, Lynn D. Wilson, Robert A. Chase, and Alvan Feinstein.
