= Annals of the Rheumatic Diseases =

- Discipline: Rheumatology
- Language: English
- Edited by: Josef Smolen

Publication details
- History: 1939–present
- Publisher: Elsevier on behalf of the European Alliance of Associations for Rheumatology
- Frequency: Monthly
- Open access: Hybrid
- Impact factor: 20.3 (2023)

Standard abbreviations
- ISO 4: Ann. Rheum. Dis.

Links
- Journal homepage; Online access; Online archive

The Annals of the Rheumatic Diseases is an international peer-reviewed medical journal. It is published by Elsevier on behalf of the European Alliance of Associations for Rheumatology and covers all aspects of rheumatology, including musculoskeletal conditions, arthritis, and connective tissue diseases. The journal publishes original research, reviews, recommendations, and various other articles, as well as abstracts from conferences. The journal was established in 1939, and operates under a hybrid subscription business model that enables open access. The editor-in-chief is Josef Smolen.

== Change of ownership and publisher ==
Until end of 2024, the Annals of the Rheumatic Diseases were published by BMJ. After a change of ownership, EULAR became the sole owner of the journal. Elsevier is the new publisher starting in January 2025.

== Abstracting and indexing ==
The journal is abstracted and indexed in the Science Citation Index Expanded, Index Medicus, Excerpta Medica, and BIOSIS Previews. According to the Journal Citation Reports, its 2023 impact factor is 20.3.

The journal has been cited most often by: Arthritis & Rheumatism, Annals of the Rheumatic Diseases, Rheumatology, Journal of Rheumatology, and Clinical and Experimental Rheumatology. The journals it has cited most are Arthritis & Rheumatism, Annals of the Rheumatic Diseases, Journal of Rheumatology, Rheumatology, and Journal of Immunology.
