= Lynn D. Wilson =

American radiation oncologist

Lynn Wilson
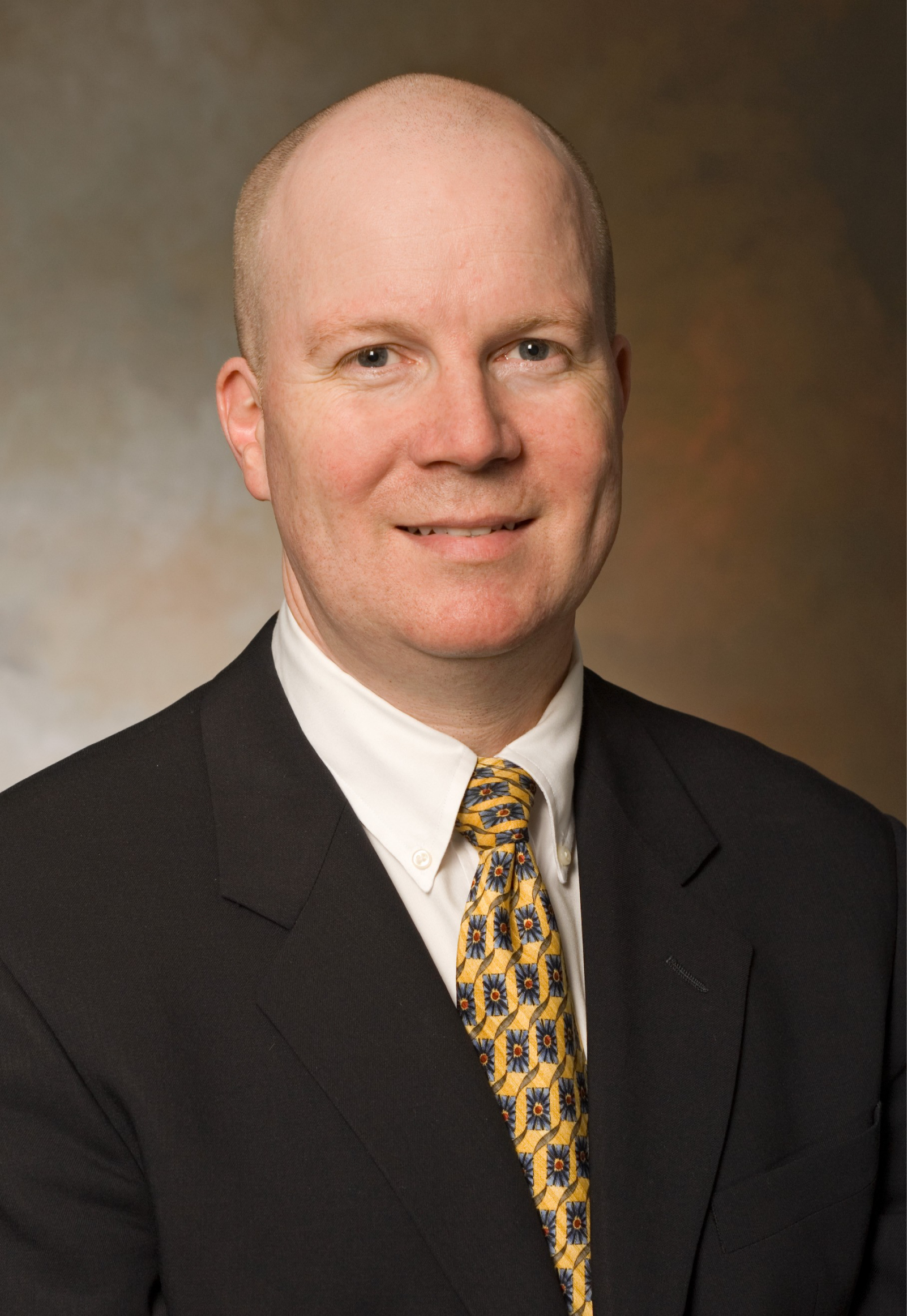
- Citizenship: American
- Education: Yale School of Medicine

Lynn D. Wilson is an American radiation oncologist. He is a professor of Therapeutic Radiology and of Dermatology, Executive Vice Chairman, Therapeutic Radiology, and Deputy Chief Medical Officer for Radiation Oncology Services at Yale Cancer Center and Yale School of Medicine in New Haven, Connecticut.

== Education ==
Wilson earned his medical degree at George Washington University School of Medicine in Washington, D.C., before completing a residency in radiation oncology at Yale New Haven Hospital; he served as a chief resident before joining the Yale School of Medicine faculty in 1994. Prior to his medical degree, Wilson received a master in public health degree, focusing on health services administration, at Yale School of Medicine.

== Career ==
Wilson worked in the laboratory of James B. Mitchell, within the Radiation Biology Branch of the National Cancer Institute/National Institutes of Health (NIH) where he also collaborated with former Commissioner of Food and Drugs Stephen Hahn on journal articles.

Wilson cares for patients with cutaneous lymphoma and breast cancer. His research focus is on outcomes and treatment-related factors for patients receiving radiation for cutaneous lymphoma and has published on radiation therapy for lung cancer as well as on breast cancer. Wilson has served as the director for clinical affairs in the Department of Therapeutic Radiology at Yale since in 2005 and was the residency training program director between 2004 and 2013.

From 2011 to 2018, Wilson served on the board of trustees for the American Board of Radiology and was a member of the American Society for Radiation Oncology board of directors from 2016 to 2020.

- He served as the American Society for Radiation Oncology (ASTRO) Chairman of the Scientific Program Committee for their Annual Meetings (2012-2015) At the American Radium Society (ARS) 91st Annual meeting, he was Chair of the Scientific Program Committee (2009).

== Personal life ==
Wilson and his wife Nancy were married in 1997 and have two children.

Wilson is a former race car driver, having raced in the Rolex 24 at Daytona three times (2001, 2002, 2004). In 2001, as part of team Autometrics, Wilson and three other drivers took 23rd place overall and 13th in class after starting 75th overall. The 2001 race was the last time an air-cooled Porsche 911 ever raced in the famed Rolex 24 hours at Daytona. The Autometrics car (#14), was the only air-cooled Porsche 911 in the GT class in the 2001 race.

== Awards and honors ==
In 2020 Wilson received the Anthony Edward Kupka ’64 Distinguished Alumnus Award from the Landon School.

In 2008, Wilson received the inaugural David J. Leffell, MD Prize for Clinical Excellence and in the same year was the recipient of the Francis Gilman Blake Award for teaching at Yale School of Medicine.
