= Walter Spitzer =

Canadian epidemiologist (1937–2006)

Walter O. Spitzer
- Born: February 19, 1937; Asuncion, Paraguay
- Died: April 27, 2006 (aged 69)
- Occupation: Epidemiologist

Walter O. Spitzer (1937–2006) was a Canadian epidemiologist and professor of epidemiology and health at McGill University, a position he held from 1975 until his retirement in 1995.

== Early life and education ==
Spitzer was born in Asuncion, Paraguay on February 19, 1937. He was the eldest son of Paul Rosenberg and Elsa Spitzer, both of whom were Baptist missionaries. He received his Doctor of Medicine degree from the University of Toronto in 1962 and his Master of Public Health degree from Yale University in 1970.

== Career ==
From 1969 to 1975, Spitzer was a faculty member at McMaster University. He was appointed a faculty member at McGill in 1975, and was credited with bringing its Department of Epidemiology and Biostatistics to "new, more collegial premises". He chaired this department from 1984 to 1993. He was the founding co-editor of the Journal of Chronic Diseases in 1982, which he and co-editor Alvan Feinstein renamed the Journal of Clinical Epidemiology in 1988. They served as the journal's co-editors until 1994. Spitzer was also the chair of the Quebec Task Force on Spinal Disorders, convened in 1983. He was elected to the Institute of Medicine in 1985.

=== Research ===
Spitzer was noted for his research into the potential adverse effects of oral contraceptives. He has also been credited as a major figure in the development of the modern system of evidence-based medicine, along with Archie Cochrane and David Sackett.

== Death ==
Spitzer died on April 27, 2006, following complications of a car accident.
