= European Alliance of Associations for Rheumatology =

- Formation: 1947; 79 years ago
- Type: Non-governmental organization
- Legal status: Society
- Headquarters: Zürich, Switzerland
- Location: Seestrasse 240, Kilchberg, Zurich
- Coordinates: 47°18′56.2″N 8°33′17.5″E
- Services: Certification, Training & Awareness
- Website: www.eular.org
- Formerly called: European League Against Rheumatism

The European Alliance of Associations for Rheumatology (EULAR) formerly the European League Against Rheumatism is a European non-governmental organization which represents the people with arthritis/rheumatism, health professional and scientific societies of rheumatology of all the European nations.

The aims of EULAR are to reduce the burden of rheumatic diseases on the individual and society and to improve the treatment, prevention and rehabilitation of musculoskeletal diseases.

It promotes the translation of research advances into daily care and fights for the recognition of the needs of people with musculoskeletal diseases by the governing bodies in Europe.

== Publications ==
The society publishes two medical journals, the Annals of the Rheumatic Diseases (ARD), and the open access journal EULAR Rheumatology Open (ERO), both published by Elsevier. The society organises an annual scientific meeting, the Annual European Congress of Rheumatology.

The society also publishes recommendations for the diagnosis and therapy of various rheumatic musculoskeletal diseases (RMD). They are published in the Annals of the Rheumatic Diseases journal and accessible also through the organisation's website.

== EULAR Presidents ==
EULAR Presidents
| Term | President | Years | Country |
|---|---|---|---|
| 1 | Matthieu Pierre Weil | 1947 - 1949 | France |
| 2 | William Sydney Charles Copeman | 1949 - 1951 | United Kingdom |
| 3 | Marcel Ferond | 1951 - 1953 | Belgium |
| 4 | Pedro Barcelo | 1953 - 1955 | Spain |
| 5 | Johan Hans Goslings | 1955 - 1957 | Netherlands |
| 6 | Jacques Forestier | 1957 - 1959 | France |
| 7 | Alessandro Robecchi | 1959 - 1961 | Italy |
| 8 | Gunnar Edstrom | 1961 - 1963 | Sweden |
| 9 | Frantisek Lenoch | 1963 - 1965 | Czechoslovakia |
| 10 | George Kersley | 1965 - 1967 | United Kingdom |
| 11 | Karl Gotsch | 1967 - 1969 | Austria |
| 12 | Stanislas de Seze | 1969 - 1971 | France |
| 13 | Veikko Aatos Ilmari Laine | 1971 - 1973 | Finland |
| 14 | Vassil T. Tzonchev | 1973 - 1975 | Bulgaria |
| 15 | Albert Böni | 1975 - 1977 | Switzerland |
| 16 | Eric George Lapthorne Bywaters | 1977 - 1979 | United Kingdom |
| 17 | Valentina Nassonova | 1979 - 1981 | USSR |
| 18 | Eimar Munthe | 1981 - 1983 | Norway |
| 19 | Hartwig Mathies | 1983 - 1985 | Germany |
| 20 | Vincenzo Pipitone | 1985 - 1987 | Italy |
| 21 | Michel G. Lequesne | 1987 - 1989 | France |
| 22 | Colin Greenhill Barnes | 1989 - 1991 | United Kingdom |
| 23 | Béla Gomor | 1991 - 1993 | Hungary |
| 24 | Juan Gijon Banos | 1993 - 1995 | Spain |
| 25 | Levinus B. A. van de Putte | 1995 - 1997 | Netherlands |
| 26 | Hubert Roux | 1997 - 1999 | France |
| 27 | Thomas L. Vischer | 1999 - 2001 | Switzerland |
| 28 | Joachim R. Kalden | 2001 - 2003 | Germany |
| 29 | Josef Smolen | 2003 - 2005 | Austria |
| 30 | Tore Kvien | 2005 - 2007 | Norway |
| 31 | Ferdinand C. Breedveld | 2007 - 2009 | Netherlands |
| 32 | Paul Emery | 2009 - 2011 | United Kingdom |
| 33 | Maxime Dougados | 2011 - 2013 | France |
| 34 | Maurizio Cutolo | 2013 - 2015 | Italy |
| 35 | Gerd R. Burmester | 2015 - 2017 | Germany |
| 36 | Johannes Bijlsma | 2017 - 2019 | Netherlands |
| 37 | Iain McInnes | 2019 - 2021 | United Kingdom |
| 38 | Annamaria Iagnocco | 2021 - 2023 | Italy |
| 39 | Daniel Aletaha | 2023 - | Austria |
