= Journal of Clinical Epidemiology =

- Discipline: Epidemiology
- Language: English
- Edited by: David Tovey and Peter Tugwell

Publication details
- History: 1988–present
- Publisher: Elsevier
- Frequency: monthly
- Impact factor: 6.437 (2020)

Standard abbreviations
- ISO 4: J. Clin. Epidemiol.

Indexing
- ISSN: 0895-4356 (print); 1878-5921 (web)
- OCLC no.: 1011201451

Links
- Journal homepage

The Journal of Clinical Epidemiology is a peer-reviewed journal of epidemiology. The journal was originally established as the Journal of Chronic Diseases in 1955 as a follow-up to Harry S. Truman's 1951 Presidential Task Force on national health concerns and the subsequently written Magnuson Report.

Under the editorial leadership of Alvan Feinstein and Walter O. Spitzer, the title of the journal was changed to the Journal of Clinical Epidemiology with the January 1988 issue. Recent members of the editorial board include André Knottnerus (Netherlands School of Primary Care Research) and Peter Tugwell (University of Ottawa).

According to the Journal Citation Reports, the journal has a 2020 Impact Factor of 6.437, ranking it 5th out of 108 journals in the category "Health Care Sciences & Services".
