= Cochrane (organisation) =

British nonprofit for reviews of medical research (formed 1993)

- Pronunciation: /ˈkɒkrɪn/
- Formation: 1993; 33 years ago (as Cochrane Collaboration)
- Type: Charity in UK
- Purpose: Independent research into data about health care
- Headquarters: London, England
- Region served: Worldwide
- Official language: English
- Key people: Susan Phillips
- Volunteers: Over 186,769 (2025)
- Website: www.cochrane.org
- Formerly called: Cochrane Collaboration

Cochrane is a British international charitable organisation formed to synthesize medical research findings to facilitate evidence-based choices about health interventions involving health professionals, patients and policy makers. It includes 53 review groups that are based at research institutions worldwide. Cochrane has over 37,000 volunteer experts from around the world.

The group conducts systematic reviews of healthcare interventions and diagnostic tests and publishes them in the Cochrane Library. While Cochrane reviews typically focus on randomized controlled trials, some reviews, particularly in areas such as public and occupational health, also incorporate other study designs. These may include non-randomised observational studies as well as controlled before–after (CBA) studies and interrupted time-series studies. According to the Library, articles are available via one-click access, though some may require registration or a subscription.

== Structure ==
The Cochrane Collaboration is a charity registered in the UK. The trustees for the charity are the members of its Governing Board, elected by members. David Sackett was the organisation's first chair. That position is currently held by Susan Phillips.

== History ==
Cochrane, previously known as the Cochrane Collaboration, was founded in 1993 under the leadership of Iain Chalmers. It was developed in response to Archie Cochrane's call for up-to-date, systematic reviews of all relevant randomised controlled trials in the field of healthcare.

In 1998, the Cochrane Economics Methods Group (CEMG) was established to facilitate the basing of decisions on health economics, evidence-based medicine, and systematic reviews.

Cochrane's suggestion that methods used to prepare and maintain reviews of controlled trials in pregnancy and childbirth be applied more widely was taken up by the Research and Development Programme, initiated to support the National Health Service. Through the NHS research and development programme, led by Michael Peckham, funds were provided to establish a "Cochrane Centre", to collaborate with others, in the UK and elsewhere, to facilitate systematic reviews of randomised controlled trials across all areas of healthcare.

In 2004, the Campbell Collaboration joined with the CEMG to form the Campbell & Cochrane Economics Methods Group (CCEMG).

In 2013 the organization published an editorial describing its efforts to train people in developing nations to perform Cochrane reviews. A 2017 editorial briefly discussed the history of Cochrane methodological approaches, such as including studies that use methodologies in lieu of randomised control trials and the challenge of having evidence adopted in practice.

During its 2018 annual meeting, the Cochrane board expelled Peter C. Gøtzsche, board member and director of Cochrane's Nordic center, from the organization, telling Nature that it had received "numerous complaints" about Gøtzsche after he co-authored an article in BMJ Evidence-Based Medicine alleging bias in Cochrane's May 2018 review of HPV vaccines. Gøtzsche's expulsion led four elected board members to resign in protest, which in turn led the board to cut two appointed members in order to comply with the ratio of elected to appointed members required by the organization's charter. Gøtzsche announced that this had happened via an open letter, in which he said there is a "growing top-down authoritarian culture and an increasingly commercial business model" taking root at Cochrane that "threaten the scientific, moral and social objectives of the organization". Gøtzsche remains an outspoken critic of Cochrane's relationship with the pharmaceutical industry. The Cochrane board stated that Gøtzsche was expelled for his behavior, which had been reviewed by an independent counsel hired by Cochrane.

=== Logo ===
The Cochrane logo includes a forest plot from an influential systematic review of randomized trials on the effects of antenatal corticosteroids.

== Reception ==
A 2004 editorial in the Canadian Medical Association Journal noted that Cochrane reviews appear to be more up to date and of better quality than other reviews, describing them as "the best single resource for methodologic research and for developing the science of meta-epidemiology" and crediting them with leading to methodological improvements in the medical literature.

Studies comparing the quality of Cochrane meta-analyses in the fields of infertility, physiotherapy, and orthodontics to those published by other sources have concluded that Cochrane reviews incorporate superior methodological rigor. A broader analysis across multiple therapeutic areas reached similar conclusions but was performed by Cochrane authors. Compared to non-Cochrane reviews, those from Cochrane are less likely to reach a positive conclusion about the utility of medical interventions.

Key criticisms that have been directed at Cochrane's studies include a failure to include a sufficiently large number of unpublished studies, failure to pre-specify or failure to abide by pre-specified rules for endpoint or trial inclusion, insufficiently frequent updating of reviews, an excessively high percentage of inconclusive reviews, and a high incidence of ghostwriting and honorary authorship. In some cases Cochrane's internal structure may make it difficult to publish studies that run against the preconceived opinions of internal subject matter experts.

== Partnerships ==
=== World Health Organization ===
Cochrane maintains an official relationship with the World Health Organization that affords Cochrane the right to appoint nonvoting representatives to WHO meetings, including sessions of the World Health Assembly, and make statements on WHO resolutions.

=== Wikipedia ===
In 2014, the Cochrane-Wikipedia partnership was formalised. This supports the inclusion of relevant evidence within all Wikipedia medical articles, as well as processes to help ensure that medical information included in Wikipedia is of the highest quality and accuracy. Wikipedia and Cochrane collaborate to increase the incorporation of Cochrane research into Wikipedia articles and provide Wikipedia editors with resources for interpreting medical data. Cochrane and John Wiley and Sons, publisher of Cochrane reviews, make one hundred free Cochrane accounts available to Wikipedia medical editors—the financial value of which has been estimated by Cochrane at between thirty thousand and eighty thousand US dollars per annum—and pay a nominal stipend and travel expenses to support a Wikipedian in Residence at Cochrane.

In 2014, the Cochrane blog hosted a rebuttal, written by four Wikipedia medical editors, of an article published in the Journal of the American Osteopathic Association that was critical of the accuracy of Wikipedia medical content.

=== Funding partners ===
Cochrane receives funding from governments, supranational organizations, non-governmental organizations, academic institutions, hospitals, and foundations, while avoiding funding from corporate interests. Primary government donors include the United Kingdom's National Institute for Health and Care Research (NIHR), the Danish Health Authority, the Federal Ministry of Health (Germany), and the National Institutes of Health (NIH).

Academic funders include McMaster University, Amsterdam University Medical Centers, Kazan Federal University, and University of Copenhagen, among others. Funding from foundations includes the National Research Foundation (South Africa) and the Gerber Foundation.

== Public involvement ==
Cochrane involves patients and the public via community curation, to produce systematic reviews and other outputs. Tasks can be organised as 'entry level' or higher. Tasks include:

- Joining a collaborative volunteer effort to help categorise and summarise healthcare evidence
- Data extraction and risk of bias assessment
- Translation of reviews into other languages

A recent systematic review of how people were involved in systematic reviews aimed to document the evidence-base relating to stakeholder involvement in systematic reviews and to use this evidence to describe how stakeholders have been involved in systematic reviews. Thirty per cent involved patients and/or carers.

While there has been some criticism of how Cochrane prioritises systematic reviews, a 2018 project involved people in helping identify research priorities to inform future Cochrane Reviews.

The representation of women as editors in Cochrane was found to be better than that of other organizations.

== See also ==
- Campbell Collaboration
- The Coalition for Evidence-Based Policy
- Evidence-based practice
