= Amaral (surname) =

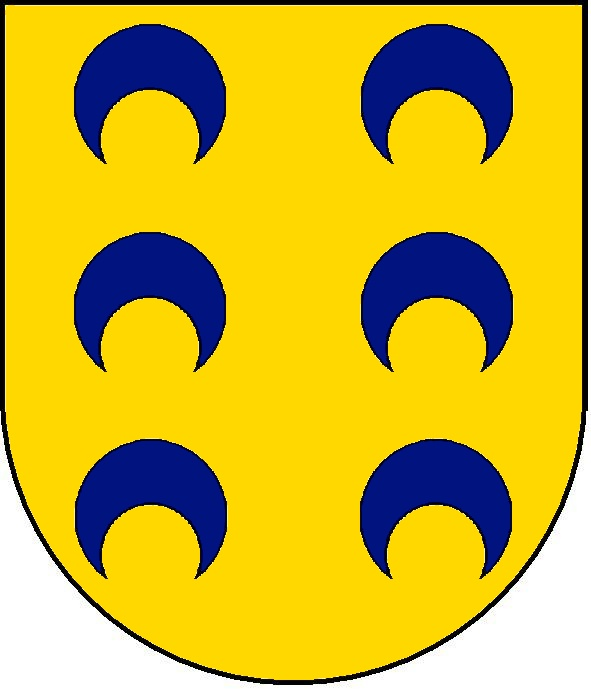
- Coat of arms associated with the Amaral surname

Origin
- Meaning: "a plantation of amara grapes"
- Region of origin: Beira, central-northern Portugal

Other names
- Variant form: do Amaral (of —or from— the plantation of amaras)

Amaral ([ɐmɐˈɾal] or [amaˈɾaw]) is a Portuguese-language surname of toponymic origin (from the central-northern Portuguese region of Beira), relatively common in Portugal and Brazil, amongst other countries. Its meaning probably comes from a plantation of a variety of grapes (azal tinto) known as amara (from the Latin language amarus/amara – "bitter", because of the taste of the fruit), used to produce wine, and the suffix -al denotes plantation. Amaral means a plantation of amaras.

Another less reliable theory says that the surname Amaral would have Jewish origins and could derive from the Aramaic term Amar-Al. Amar would be the word, message, expression or concept and Al would be God, what is above, The Supreme. Amaral would mean, according to this theory, said by God.

This family name is considered to be of high lineage because it descends from the King Ramiro II of León. The current people with this surname are probably of pre-Roman Lusitanian, Christian Visigothic and possibly some Sephardic Jewish and Berber (Amazigh) descent.

The coat of arms of this family name is composed of six upside-down crescent moons, possibly for an anti-Islamic reason. The Iberian Peninsula was occupied by Arab-Berber Muslims from Maghreb during the Middle Ages.

The surname Amaral can have the preposition do (a contraction in which the preposition de [of] combines with the masculine definite article o [masculine form of "the"], producing do [de + o = do] — because Amaral is a masculine word, in Portuguese), indicating belonging or origin (do Amaral) — literally of the or from.

== People ==
- Afrânio Pompílio Gastos do Amaral (1894–1982), Brazilian herpetologist
- Aguida Amaral (born 1972), Timor Leste runner
- Ana Luísa Amaral (1956–2022), Portuguese poet and professor
- André Amaral, Epidemiologist
- André Claro Amaral Ventura (born 1983), Portuguese politician
- Anthony Amaral (1930–1982), US West Historian, horse trainer
- Aracy Amaral (1930–2026), Brazilian art historian and curator
- Carlos do Amaral Freire, Brazilian scholar, linguist and translator
- Crispim do Amaral (1858–1911), Brazilian artist who painted the curtain at the Amazon Theatre
- Dante Amaral (born 1980), Brazilian volleyball player more commonly known as Dante
- David Amaral (born 1950), US professor of psychiatry
- Francisco Keil do Amaral (1910–1975), Portuguese architect, composer, painter and photographer
- Jonathan Amaral (born 2002), Indian professional esports player
- Karoline Amaral (born 1984), Brazilian model
- Luís Amaral (born 1968), Portuguese physicist
- Maria Adelaide Amaral (born 1942), Portuguese-born Brazilian playwright, screenwriter, novelist
- Maria do Carmo Estanislau do Amaral (born 1959), Brazilian botanist
- Miguel Amaral (born 1954), Portuguese businessperson, race car driver
- Rich Amaral (born 1962), US baseball player
- Silvino Gurgel do Amaral (1874–1961), Brazilian diplomat
- Yara Amaral (1936–1988), Brazilian actress

=== Artists ===
- Eva Amaral (born 1972), Spanish singer-songwriter
- José Carlos Amaral Vieira (born 1952), Brazilian composer, pianist, musicologist
- Marina Amaral (born 1994), Brazilian colorist
- Olga de Amaral (born 1932), Colombian textile artist
- Roberto Amaral, flamenco dancer and singer for British/US rock band Carmen
- Tarsila do Amaral (1886–1973), Brazilian painter

=== Politicians ===
- Diogo Freitas do Amaral (1941–2019), Portuguese politician
- Francisco Joaquim Ferreira do Amaral (1843–1923), Portuguese naval commander, politician
- Francisco Xavier do Amaral (1937–2012), Timor Leste politician
- Joana Amaral Dias (born 1973), Portuguese politician and clinical psychologist
- João Maria Ferreira do Amaral (1803–1849), Portuguese colonial governor of Macau
- Marília Amaral (born 1999), Brazilian politician
- Moisés da Costa Amaral (1938–1989), Timor Leste politician
- Sérgio Amaral (1944–2023), Brazilian politician, diplomat
- Tabata Amaral (born 1993), Brazilian politician, education activist

=== Footballers ===
==== Footballers with the surname Amaral ====
- Amarildo Souza do Amaral (born 1964), Brazilian footballer
- António Amaral (born 1955), Portuguese footballer
- Carlos Rafael do Amaral (born 1983), Brazilian football player
- Casemiro do Amaral (1892–1939), Brazilian footballer
- David Amaral (footballer) (born 1958), Spanish footballer and coach
- Edinho (footballer, born 1967), Brazilian footballer, Edon Amaral Neto
- João Henrique de Andrade Amaral (born 1981), Brazilian footballer more commonly known as Andrade
- João Pedro Reis Amaral (born 1991), Portuguese footballer
- Jorge Amaral Rodrigues (born 1970), Portuguese footballer
- Leandro Amaral (born 1977), Brazilian footballer
- Paulo Lima Amaral (1923–2008), Brazilian footballer and coach
- Pedro Amaral (born 1997), Portuguese footballer
- Rodrigo Amaral (born 1997), Uruguayan footballer
- Thiago Amaral (born 1992), Brazilian footballer

==== Footballers nicknamed as Amaral (with the surname) ====
- Amaral (footballer, 1954-2024), Brazilian international footballer João Justino Amaral dos Santos
- Amaral (footballer, born 1983), Brazilian footballer Carlos Rafael do Amaral

==== Footballers nicknamed as Amaral (without the surname) ====
- Amaral (footballer, born 1966), Brazilian footballer Wagner Pereira Cardozo
- Amaral (footballer, born 1973), Brazilian international footballer Alexandre da Silva Mariano
- Amaral (footballer, born 1978), Brazilian footballer Anderson Conrado
- Amaral (footballer, born 1986), Brazilian footballer William José de Souza
- Amaral (footballer, born 1987), Brazilian footballer Antônio Cleilson da Silva Feitosa
- Amaral (footballer, born 1988), Brazilian footballer Mauricio Azevedo Alves

== Fictional characters ==
- Buddy Amaral, the main character (played by Ben Affleck) in the 2000 movie Bounce
