= John M. Last =

- Born: September 22, 1926; Australia
- Died: September 11, 2019 (aged 92); Ottawa, Ontario, Canada
- Education: University of Adelaide
- Scientific career
- Fields: Epidemiology
- Workplaces: University of Ottawa

John Murray Last OC (September 22, 1926 - September 11, 2019) was a Canadian public health scholar, author, scientist and teacher. His reference texts are used by schools of public health as well as community medicine and epidemiology practitioners throughout the world. He was also an outspoken advocate for change, especially on the need for a stronger and more effective voice for public health, and the need for political action on climate change.

== Education ==
Born in Australia in 1926, John Last obtained his MB BS in 1949 and his MD (by thesis) in 1968, from the University of Adelaide. In the interim he undertook 5 years of hospital-based training, 5 years in general practice, and served as a ship's surgeon. In 1960 he obtained a DPH from the University of Sydney, and was then appointed Visiting Fellow, Medical Research Council Social Medicine Research Unit, London Hospital Medical College, England (1961–62). He earned specialty recognition in Australasia (FRACP 1973; FRACPHM 1990), the United States (FACPM 1980; FACE 1981), the United Kingdom (FFCM 1982), and Canada (FRCPC 1987).

== Career ==
Last made substantive contributions to public health higher education, especially in the public health reference literature, including the dissemination of methods for public health research, and to clarifying related ethical issues. He has held academic posts at the University of Sydney, the University of Vermont, and the University of Edinburgh, and was professor of epidemiology and community medicine at the University of Ottawa since 1969 until the time of his death, then with the status of emeritus professor.

Last's initial research emphasis was on primary medical care, as reflected in work conducted mainly during the 1960s; this substantial body of work (approximately 30 published papers over the decade, selections cited here) includes observations on the health of immigrants, maternal and child health, communication issues and community health services, and the organization and economics of medical care in Australia. He published also on issues of measurement, record keeping, evaluation and quality of care. And addressing the challenge being faced by the United Kingdom, which was experiencing an exodus of physicians, he addressed related aspects of medical manpower planning.

Perhaps his most enduring contribution to the health care research literature of the 1960s was a description of the "iceberg": a common phenomenon in the natural history of disease where only a relatively small proportion of cases of a given disease, "the tip of the iceberg", comes to the attention of the health care system. The "submerged part" goes undiagnosed and unreported. The proportion of missed cases varies with the disease and its severity. This contribution (including a table on clinical and subclinical disease) was incorporated (and duly referenced) by Jerry Morris, a long-standing colleague of Last, in his textbook on Uses of Epidemiology.

A leader in the development of ethical standards for epidemiology and public health, Last led the International Epidemiological Association initiative to develop guidelines on ethical conduct of epidemiological research, practice, and teaching (1987–93); he was a member of the Working Group of the Council for International Organizations of Medical Sciences that drafted International Guidelines for Ethical Review of Epidemiological Studies (1991).

He made numerous contributions to the public health reference literature, especially in the capacity of a scientific editor. He edited four editions of Public Health and Preventive Medicine (1980, 1986, 1991, 1998), known as "Maxcy-Rosenau-Last" and is editor-emeritus of the 15th edition in 2008. As founding editor, he produced four editions of the Dictionary of Epidemiology (1983, 1988; 1995, 2001); The successor and current editor of the dictionary is the Catalan scholar Miquel Porta. This dictionary has been translated into French, Spanish, Portuguese, Chinese, Japanese, Arabic, Persian, Serbian, Slovak, Russian and Ukrainian. A new (7th) edition will be published in April, 2026. He co-edited the Oxford Illustrated Companion to Medicine 3rd edition (2001) and An Encyclopedia of Public Health (2002). He was contributing editor on public health sciences and practice for Stedman's Medical Dictionary (1990, 1995, 2000, 2005) and the New Oxford American Dictionary (2001). He was scientific editor of the Canadian Journal of Public Health 1981–1991, editor of the Annals of the Royal College of Physicians and Surgeons of Canada 1990–1998, and interim editor of the American Journal of Preventive Medicine in 1988–89. Author of Public Health and Human Ecology (1987, 1996), he continues to contribute to the field: as editor of a Dictionary of Public Health (2006), and as coauthor of Global Public Health - Ecological Foundations (2013).

His main scholarly interests in his active retirement were the interactions of ecosystem health with human health: he served in related advisory capacities, including as a reviewer (1998–99) for the Health Sector Working Group of the United Nations Intergovernmental Panel on Climate Change.

== Philosophical reflections ==
In a 2014 interview, in his 88th year, John Last was asked: "What are some key lessons you've learned over your career?" In reply, this is what he said:

"I've been in public health for over 50 years, and I've learned a lot. And I'm still a student. I learn something new every day. I think of myself as a perpetual learner. I believe it's helped to keep me youthful: I am an old man in years of life lived, but I've preserved my youthful enthusiasm for learning, and that has kept me young in spirit. In terms of key lessons, avoid getting locked into rigid positions. Tolerate ambiguity. Conditions are changing and they're going to go on changing. It’s absolutely essential to keep an open mind, keep your options open, and of course, keep your skills up-to-date. And be prepared to defend controversial issues. Remain flexible, so you can adapt to changing conditions. A species that over-specializes to cope with a particular set of conditions is in danger of extinction when conditions change. Over-specialized professional people likewise risk extinction (i.e., becoming redundant) when conditions change. That's why it's essential to remain flexible and adaptable."

Later in the same interview, he stated:

"...our duty as public health officials is to assemble, assess and evaluate the evidence on public health problems affecting the population we serve. We must show leadership in presenting this evidence to elected officials to whom we are answerable, and must be prepared also to communicate this evidence to the general public, along with actions needed to control the public health problems that we identify. We must be prepared to defend our decisions, which are sometimes opposed by eloquent representatives of powerful vested interest groups. To be effective in this role, we need political savvy – sometimes the most important of the skills we possess."

== Honours and awards ==
John Last's honors include an honorary doctorate from the Faculty of Medicine at Uppsala University, Sweden, 1993, and MD Honoris Causa of Edinburgh University, 2003. He was Wade Hampton Frost lecturer, American Public Health Association, 1989; Scholar in Residence, Rockefeller Foundation's Villa Serbelloni Study and Conference Center, Bellagio, 1992. In recognition of lifetime achievements, he received the Duncan Clark Award of the Association of Teachers of Preventive Medicine in 1994, the Abraham Lilienfeld Award of the American College of Epidemiology in 1997, the Defries Award, highest honour of the Canadian Public Health Association in 2006, and the Sedgwick Memorial Medal of the American Public Health Association in 2008. He is an honorary life member of the International Epidemiological Association, the American College of Epidemiology, the American Public Health Association, the UK Society for Social Medicine, the Royal Australasian College of Physicians and the British Medical Association.

In 2012 John Last was admitted as an Officer of the Order of Canada in recognition of his service to public health sciences.
