= Carlos do Amaral =

Carlos do Amaral may refer to:

- Carlos do Amaral Freire, Brazilian scholar, linguist and translator
- Carlos Rafael do Amaral (born 1983), Brazilian football midfielder
