= Peter Burney =

British epidemiologist

- Born: 1949 (age 76–77); USA
- Citizenship: British
- Education: University of Oxford
- Known for: Epidemiology of COPD; Epidemiology of Asthma; Epidemiology of Allergy
- Scientific career
- Fields: Respiratory Epidemiology; Public health
- Workplaces: National Heart & Lung Institute; Imperial College London
- Website: https://www.imperial.ac.uk/people/p.burney

Peter Burney is a British epidemiologist. He is emeritus professor of respiratory epidemiology and public health at the National Heart and Lung Institute, Imperial College London. He is a Fellow of the Academy of Medical Sciences since 2001.

== Education and career ==
He studied Modern History at University of Oxford, trained in Medicine at the Middlesex Hospital Medical School and then Public Health with Walter W. Holland in the Department of Community Medicine, St Thomas's Hospital Medical School, London. He became the Chair in Public Health Medicine at United Medical and Dental Schools of Guy's and St Thomas' Hospitals in 1995, and then Head of the Division of Public Health and Primary Care at King's College London. He also led the Social Medicine and Health Services Research Unit, which was funded by the Department of Health. In 1996, he was Chair of the Respiratory Disease Committee of the International Union Against Tuberculosis and Lung Disease. He moved to Imperial College London in 2006.

Burney led several important and pioneering international collaborative studies on asthma and allergy, including the European Community Respiratory Health Survey (ECRHS) and the GA^{2}LEN epidemiological study, and on COPD with the Burden of Obstructive Lung Disease (BOLD) study. The BOLD study is now led by André Amaral. As result of his work, he has provided evidence on asthma and allergy to the Lords Select Committee on Science and Technology in 2006 and has been interviewed by mainstream media. In 2014, he contributed to a European Respiratory Society video about the Burden of COPD - ERS Vision.

== Significant publications ==
- Burney, Peter G.J.; Potts, James; Knox-Brown, Ben; Erhabor, Gregory; Hacene Cherkaski, Hamid; Mortimer, Kevin; Anand, Mahesh Padukudru; Mannino, David M; Cardoso, Joao; Ahmed, Rana; Elsony, Asma; Barbara, Cristina; Nielsen, Rune; Bateman, Eric; Paraguas, Stefanni Nonna M; Cher Loh, Li; Rashid, Abdul; Wouters, Emiel FM; Franssen, Frits ME; Dias, Hermínia Brites; Gislason, Thorarinn; Ghobain, Mohammed Al; Biaze, Mohammed El; Agarwal, Dhiraj; Juvekar, Sanjay; Rodrigues, Fatima; Obaseki, Daniel O; Koul, Parvaiz A.; Harrabi, Imed; Nafees, Asaad A; Seemungal, Terence; Janson, Christer; Vollmer, William M; Amaral, Andre FS; Buist, A Sonia (31 December 2025). "Geographical variation in lung function: Results from the multicentric cross-sectional BOLD study". Pulmonology. 31 (1). doi:10.1080/25310429.2024.2430491. PMC 11627206. PMID 39641354.
- Burney, Peter, ed. (2025). Small lungs and obstructed airways: Reassessing chronic obstructive pulmonary disease. doi:10.1016/C2022-0-02478-8. ISBN 978-0-443-13922-2.
- Burney, Peter; Patel, Jaymini; Minelli, Cosetta; Gnatiuc, Louisa; Amaral, André F. S.; Kocabaş, Ali; Cherkaski, Hamid Hacene; Gulsvik, Amund; Nielsen, Rune; Bateman, Eric; Jithoo, Anamika (2021-06-01). "Prevalence and Population-Attributable Risk for Chronic Airflow Obstruction in a Large Multinational Study". American Journal of Respiratory and Critical Care Medicine. 203 (11): 1353–1365. doi:10.1164/rccm.202005-1990OC. ISSN 1073-449X. PMC 8456536. PMID 33171069.
- Jarvis, Debbie; Newson, Roger; Janson, Christer; Corsico, Angelo; Heinrich, Joachim; Anto, Josep M; Abramson, Michael J; Kirsten, Anne-Marie; Zock, Jan Paul; Bono, Roberto; Demoly, Pascal (January 2018). "Prevalence of asthma-like symptoms with ageing". Thorax. 73 (1): 37–48. doi:10.1136/thoraxjnl-2016-209596. ISSN 0040-6376. PMC 5738606. PMID 28974648.
- Amaral, André F.S.; Coton, Sonia; Kato, Bernet; Tan, Wan C.; Studnicka, Michael; Janson, Christer; Gislason, Thorarinn; Mannino, David; Bateman, Eric D.; Buist, Sonia; Burney, Peter G.J. (October 2015). "Tuberculosis associates with both airflow obstruction and low lung function: BOLD results". European Respiratory Journal. 46 (4): 1104–1112. doi:10.1183/13993003.02325-2014. ISSN 0903-1936. PMC 4594762. PMID 26113680.
- Burney, Peter G.J.; Patel, Jaymini; Newson, Roger; Minelli, Cosetta; Naghavi, Mohsen (May 2015). "Global and regional trends in COPD mortality, 1990–2010". European Respiratory Journal. 45 (5): 1239–1247. doi:10.1183/09031936.00142414. ISSN 0903-1936. PMC 4531307. PMID 25837037.
- Antó, J. M.; Sunyer, J.; Basagaña, X.; Garcia-Esteban, R.; Cerveri, I.; De Marco, R.; Heinrich, J.; Janson, C.; Jarvis, D.; Kogevinas, M.; Kuenzli, N. (2010-02-04). "Risk factors of new-onset asthma in adults: a population-based international cohort study: Risk factors of new-onset asthma in adults". Allergy. 65 (8): 1021–1030. doi:10.1111/j.1398-9995.2009.02301.x. PMID 20132157. S2CID 205404673.
- Kummeling, I.; Mills, E. N. C.; Clausen, M.; Dubakiene, R.; Pérez, C. Farnãndez; Fernández-Rivas, M.; Knulst, A. C.; Kowalski, M. L.; Lidholm, J.; Le, T.-M.; Metzler, C. (October 2009). "The EuroPrevall surveys on the prevalence of food allergies in children and adults: background and study methodology". Allergy. 64 (10): 1493–1497. doi:10.1111/j.1398-9995.2009.02046.x. ISSN 0105-4538. PMID 19385958. S2CID 6401791.
