= Department of Community Medicine, St Thomas's Hospital Medical School, London =

Department of Community Medicine, St Thomas's Hospital Medical School, London was the foremost centre for public health research in the UK in the 1970s and 1980s. Some of its records are held in The National Archives (United Kingdom).

It was established in 1968 by Walter W. Holland who subsequently obtained core funding from the UK Department of Health to establish the integral interdisciplinary Social Medicine and Health Services Research Unit. In the 1980s the medical school merged with Guy's Hospital Medical School and subsequently became part of GKT School of Medical Education. The department was renamed the Department of Public Health Medicine. Holland continued to direct the department and unit until 1994 when he retired. He was replaced by Professor Peter Burney who directed the unit until 2006.

== Publications ==
Over a period of 26 years this research unit produced numerous influential reports, articles and books on major contemporary health challenges. Examples include:

- Florey, C. duV. et al. (1983) Introduction to Community Medicine. Churchill Livingstone.
- Holland, W.W., Detels, R. & Knox, G. (eds.)(1986, 1991, 1997) Oxford Textbook of Public Health (4 vols.) Oxford University Press.
- Murray M., Jarrett, L., Swan A.V. & Rumun, R. (1988). Smoking among young adults. Avebury.
- Patrick, D.L. & Peach, H. (eds.) (1989). Disablement in the community. Oxford University Press.
- Peach, H. & Heller, R. (1984). Epidemiology of Common Diseases. Heinemann Medical.

== Notable people ==
Over the span of its existence a large number of people worked in the centre and many went on to hold senior positions in other institutions. These include:

- Douglas Altman FMedSci (1948-2018) - Professor of Statistics in Medicine, University of Oxford; known for work on improving the reliability and reporting of medical research and for papers on statistical methodology
- Roger Beech (d. 2018) - Reader in Health Services Research, Keele University, Staffordshire
- Gwyn Bevan - Professor of Management Science, London School of Economics.
- Beulah Bewley DBE FRCP FFPH (1929-2018) - Reader in Public Health, London School of Hygiene and Tropical Medicine; past president of the Medical Women's Federation
- Martin Bland (b. 1947) - Professor of Health Statistics, University of York
- John Brazier FMedSci (b. 1961) - Professor of Health Economics and Dean of School of Health and Related Research, University of Sheffield
- Peter Burney FRCP FFPH FMedSci (b. 1949) - Professor of Respiratory Epidemiology and Public Health, Imperial College London; known for his work on asthma and respiratory health.
- Susan Chinn - Professor of Medical Statistics, King's College London
- Sarah Darby FRS FMedSci - Professor of Medical Statistics, University of Oxford; winner of Guy Medal in Bronze in 1988 by the Royal Statistical Society; elected a Fellow of the Royal Society (FRS) in 2019.
- Karen Dunnell DCB FAcSS (b. 1946) - UK National Statistician and Chief Executive of the Office for National Statistics of the United Kingdom and head of the Government Statistical Service
- Charles du Vé Florey (b. 1934) - James Mackenzie Professor of Community Medicine, University of Dundee; known for his work on the effects of air pollution on respiratory health.
- Richard Heller FFPH FRCP - Professor of Public Health, University of Manchester; Founder and coordinator of the Peoples-uni (http://peoples-uni.org) which aimed to provide Public Health capacity building in developing countries at low cost
- Walter W. Holland CBE FFPH FRCP (1929-2018) - Professor of Public Health Medicine, University of London; past President of the International Epidemiological Association and of the Faculty of Community Medicine/Public Health Medicine of the UK Royal College of Physicians
- Mark Johnson (died 2024)- Professor of Diversity in Health & Social Care, Founder of the Mary Seacole Research Centre, De Montfort University, Leicester
- Joseph Kaufert (1943-2023) - Professor of Community Health, University of Manitoba; founder of British Society for Medical Anthropology and President of the Canadian Association for Medical Anthropology
- David Locker (1948-2010): Professor of Community Dentistry, University of Toronto; Professor David Locker Scholarship established by University of Sheffield
- David Morrell OBE FRCGP (1929-2012) - Wolfson Professor of General Practice in associated Department of General Practice; President, British Medical Association (1994)
- Myfanwy Morgan FFPH - Professor of Medical Sociology, King's College London
- Richard Morris (b. 1955) - Professor of Medical Statistics, University of Bristol
- Michael Murray FBPsS FAcSS (b. 1952) - Professor of Social & Health Psychology, Keele University
- Stephen Palmer FFPH FRCP FLSW (born 1951) - Mansel Talbot Professor of Epidemiology and Public Health, University of Cardiff
- Donald L. Patrick (b. 1944) - Professor of Health Services, University of Washington; Member of the US National Academy of Medicine; First President of International Society for Quality of Life Research -
- Hedley Peach FFPH (1951-2024) - Professor of Public Health and Community Medicine, University of Melbourne
- Roberto Rona FFPH - Professor of Public Health Medicine, King's College London; expert on children's health and military mental health
- Ellie Scrivens (1954-2008) - Professor of Health Policy, Keele University
- Tony Swan - Head, Statistics Unit, Public Health Laboratory Service, Colindale, London
- Richard Wiggins FAcSS - Professor of Quantitative Social Science, UCL Institute of Education
