= Miquel Porta =

Miquel Porta (Barcelona, 1957) is a Catalan physician, epidemiologist and scholar. He has promoted the integration of biological, clinical and environmental knowledge and methods in health research and teaching, which he has conducted internationally; notably, in Spain, at the University of North Carolina at Chapel Hill, Harvard, Imperial College London, and several other universities in Europe, North America, Kuwait, and Brazil. Appointed by the International Epidemiological Association (IEA), in 2008 he succeeded the Canadian epidemiologist John M. Last as Editor of "A Dictionary of Epidemiology". In the Preface to this book he argues for an inclusive and integrative practice of the science of epidemiology. In September 2023, Porta made public through several social networks a call to propose changes to the new, 7th. edition of the dictionary; it was published in April, 2026.

He is currently the head of the Clinical and Molecular Epidemiology of Cancer Unit at the Hospital del Mar Institute of Medical Research - IMIM Hospital del Mar Research Institute. He is also a Professor of Preventive Medicine & Public Health, School of Medicine, Universitat Autònoma de Barcelona (UAB), an adjunct professor of Epidemiology at the Gillings School of Global Public Health, University of North Carolina at Chapel Hill (UNC), and an adjunct professor at the New York University (NYU) Grossman School of Medicine. After graduating from the UAB School of Medicine in 1981, Porta was during 3 years a Fellow with the Division of Clinical Pharmacology of UAB. He was then awarded a Fulbright scholarship to pursue the Master of Public Health (MPH) program at UNC, where he was later a Burroughs Wellcome Postdoctoral Fellow in Pharmacoepidemiology.

The main lines of research of his Unit at IMIM are: 1) Clinical and molecular epidemiology of pancreatic cancer; gene-environment interactions with environmental compounds in the etiopathogenesis of pancreatic diseases. 2) Screening, early clinical detection, and "diagnostic delay" in cancer. 3) Biomonitoring and assessment of the impact on human health of environmental pollutants.

Other than at the UAB School of Medicine, he has also taught on molecular epidemiology, clinical epidemiology and pharmacoepidemiology at other institutions, including McGill University (Montreal, Canada), Imperial College (London), the European Educational Programme in Epidemiology (Firenze, Italy), several universities in Kuwait, Germany, Norway, Italy, Brazil and Mexico, and at Harvard, where he was on sabbatical in 1998-1999. He has acted as a grant and doctoral thesis reviewer for the Karolinska Institutet, the Finnish Academy, Diabetes UK, and several other European and American scientific organisations.

From 1994 to 1998 he was President of the Spanish Society of Epidemiology (SEE). From 2002 to 2005 he was European Councillor of the International Epidemiological Association (IEA) and Chairman of the IEA European Epidemiology Federation.

He is (co)author of several hundred academic papers. Beyond his main lines of research, he has written on topics such as causality and the Bovine spongiform encephalopathy (BSE) / Creutzfeldt–Jakob disease (vCJD) link, persistent organic pollutants and public health, genome metaphors, the bibliographic impact factor and scientific journals, or the roles of scientific associations, among other issues.

He is an editor of the 'European Journal of Epidemiology'.

In 2018 he published his first book addressed to the general public on human internal contamination and ways to prevent it. In 2019 he edited 'Los imaginarios colectivos, la salud pública y la vida. Para conversar desde las artes sobre nuestro bienestar en sociedad', an internationally unique collection of texts relating public health and medicine with the arts. In 2022 he published 'Epidemiología cercana', a collection of essays on epidemiology, culture, ethics, and policies.
