= International Journal of Epidemiology =

- Discipline: Epidemiology
- Language: English
- Edited by: Stephen Leeder

Publication details
- History: 1972–present
- Publisher: Oxford University Press
- Frequency: Bimonthly
- Open access: Hybrid
- Impact factor: 9.685 (2021)

Standard abbreviations
- ISO 4: Int. J. Epidemiol.

Indexing
- CODEN: IJEPBF
- ISSN: 0300-5771 (print); 1464-3685 (web)
- LCCN: 73640972
- OCLC no.: 01784923

Links
- Journal homepage; Online access; Online archive

The International Journal of Epidemiology is a bimonthly peer-reviewed medical journal covering research in epidemiology. It is the official journal of the International Epidemiological Association and is published by Oxford University Press. The journal is a member of the Committee on Publication Ethics. The editor-in-chief is Stephen Leeder (University of Sydney).

== History ==
The journal was established in 1972 by the International Epidemiological Association to facilitate communication among its members and all those engaged in research, teaching and the application of epidemiology. The first editor-in-chief, Walter W. Holland, hoped to "overcome some of the problems of publication of epidemiological work in local journals, which often tend to be unavailable to workers outside that country" and to "create an international viewpoint of health problems."

== Editors ==
The following persons are or have been editors-in-chief:

- 1972–1977: Walter W. Holland
- 1978–1981: A.E. Bennett
- 1982–1990: Charles du Vé Florey
- 1991–2000: Peter O.D. Pharoah
- 2001–2016: George Davey Smith and Shah Ebrahim
- 2017–present: Stephen Leeder

== Abstracting and indexing ==
The journal is abstracted and indexed by:

- Abstracts on Hygiene and Communicable Diseases
- Biological Abstracts
- BIOSIS Previews
- CAB Abstracts
- Current Contents/Clinical Medicine
- Current Contents/Life Sciences
- Embase/Excerpta Medica
- Index Medicus/MEDLINE/PubMed
- Science Citation Index
- Tropical Diseases Bulletin

According to the Journal Citation Reports, the journal has a 2021 impact factor of 9.685.
