= Carlos Freire =

Carlos Freire may refer to:

- Carlos do Amaral Freire, Brazilian scholar, linguist and translator
- Carlos Freire (footballer) (born 1959), Portuguese retired footballer
