= Work study =

Work study or Work Study may refer to:

- Diligent Work-Frugal Study Movement also known as Work-Study Movement, a program to bring Chinese students into France and Belgium in the early 20th century
- Cooperative education
- Federal Work-Study Program in the United States
- Internship
- Job analysis
- Time and motion study
- International Journal of Productivity and Performance Management
