= Molecular epidemiology =

Molecular epidemiology is a branch of epidemiology and medical science that focuses on the contribution of potential genetic and environmental risk factors, identified at the molecular level, to the etiology, distribution and prevention of disease within families and across populations. This field has emerged from the integration of molecular biology into traditional epidemiological research. Molecular epidemiology improves our understanding of the pathogenesis of disease by identifying specific pathways, molecules and genes that influence the risk of developing disease. More broadly, it seeks to establish understanding of how the interactions between genetic traits and environmental exposures result in disease.

== History ==
The term "molecular epidemiology" was first coined by Edwin D. Kilbourne in a 1973 article entitled "The molecular epidemiology of influenza". The term became more formalized with the formulation of the first book on molecular epidemiology titled Molecular Epidemiology: Principles and Practice by Paul A. Schulte and Frederica Perera. At the heart of this book is the impact of advances in molecular research that have given rise to and enabled the measurement and exploitation of the biomarker as a vital tool to link traditional molecular and epidemiological research strategies to understand the underlying mechanisms of disease in populations.

== Modern use ==
While most molecular epidemiology studies are using conventional disease designation system for an outcome (with the use of exposures at the molecular level), compelling evidence indicates that disease evolution represents inherently heterogeneous process differing from person to person. Conceptually, each individual has a unique disease process different from any other individual ("the unique disease principle"), considering uniqueness of the exposome and its unique influence on molecular pathologic process in each individual. Studies to examine the relationship between an exposure and molecular pathologic signature of disease (particularly, cancer) became increasingly common throughout the 2000s. However, the use of molecular pathology in epidemiology posed unique challenges including lack of standardized methodologies and guidelines as well as paucity of interdisciplinary experts and training programs. The use of "molecular epidemiology" for this type of research masked the presence of these challenges, and hindered the development of methods and guidelines. Furthermore, the concept of disease heterogeneity appears to conflict with the premise that individuals with the same disease name have similar etiologies and disease processes.

== Analytical methods ==
The genome of a bacterial species fundamentally determines its identity. Thus, gel electrophoresis techniques like pulsed-field gel electrophoresis can be used in molecular epidemiology to comparatively analyze patterns of bacterial chromosomal fragments and to elucidate the genomic content of bacterial cells. Due to its widespread use and ability to analyse epidemiological information about most bacterial pathogens based on their molecular markers, pulsed-field gel electrophoresis is relied upon heavily in molecular epidemiological studies.

== Applications ==
Molecular epidemiology allows for an understanding of the molecular outcomes and implications of diet, lifestyle, and environmental exposure, particularly how these choices and exposures result in acquired genetic mutations and how these mutations are distributed throughout selected populations through the use of biomarkers and genetic information. Molecular epidemiological studies are able to provide additional understanding of previously-identified risk factors and disease mechanisms. Specific applications include:

- Molecular surveillance of disease risk factors
- Measuring the geographical and temporal distribution of disease risk factors
- Characterizing the evolution of pathogens and classifying new pathogen species

== Criticism ==
While the use of advanced molecular analysis techniques within the field of molecular epidemiology is providing the larger field of epidemiology with greater means of analysis, Miquel Porta identified several challenges that the field of molecular epidemiology faces, particularly selecting and incorporating requisite applicable data in an unbiased manner. Limitations of molecular epidemiological studies are similar in nature to those of generic epidemiological studies, that is, samples of convenience - both of the target population and genetic information, small sample sizes, inappropriate statistical methods, poor quality control, and poor definition of target populations.

== See also ==
- Genetic epidemiology
- Genome-wide association study
- Genomics
- Molecular medicine
- Personalized medicine
- Precision medicine
