= Nubia Muñoz =

Colombian scientist

- Born: Cali, Colombia
- Education: Universidad del Valle; Johns Hopkins University
- Occupations: Cancer researcher, Epidemiologist

Nubia Muñoz is a Colombian medical scientist and epidemiologist, whose research has been instrumental in establishing that human papillomavirus (HPV) infection is the primary cause of cervical cancer which has led to the development of a vaccine that is capable of preventing 70% of all cervical cancers.

== Biography ==
Her father, a farm worker in Cali died of diphtheria when she was six years old. She would be the only one of her siblings to go to university when she was accepted into the medical school at Universidad del Valle, specializing in Pathology. After graduating, she completed a fellowship at the National Cancer Institute in Bethesda, Maryland, United States with an emphasis in pathology and virology. She then earned a Master's Degree in Public Health (Cancer Epidemiology) from Johns Hopkins University in Baltimore, Maryland.

In 1969, she joined the International Agency for Research on Cancer (IARC) headquarters in Lyon, France, where she researched cancers formed due to pathogens. In the 1980s, she led her own unit at the IARC, where she studied the link between HPV and cervical cancer. In 1995, she was instrumental in the IARC's decision to classify HPVs 16 and 18 as group 1 human carcinogens.

She retired from the IARC in 2001, but continues to work at the Catalan Institute of Oncology in Barcelona and the National Cancer Institute in Bogotá where she is Emeritus Professor.

== Recognition and awards ==
- Honorary Degree, Doctor of Science (D.Sc.), McGill University
- International Agency for Research on Cancer Medal of Honor
- Canada Gairdner Global Health Award
- Charles Rodolphe Brupbacher Prize for Cancer Research
- 2008 International Epidemiological Association's Richard Doll Prize
- 2018 Frontiers of Knowledge Award, Development Cooperation category
- Rumored to have been nominated for the Nobel Prize in Physiology and Medicine in 2008
