= Peoples-uni =

UK non-profit organisation

People's Open Access Educational Initiative
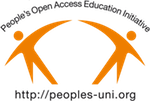
- Type: Private non-profit
- Established: 2007
- Location: Manchester, U.K.
- Campus: Virtual
- Website: http://www.peoples-uni.org/

The People's Open Access Education Initiative, abbreviated as Peoples-uni, is a non-profit organisation established in 2007 to help build public health capacity in developing countries through low cost online education for health professionals.

== History ==
Peoples-uni was registered as a charity by the UK Charity Commission in 2007, and the first students were admitted in 2008. Since then, over one thousand students from more than 40 countries have enrolled. Manchester Metropolitan University validated the courses so that students could gain the Master of Public Health (MPH) award there.

== Organization and administration ==
Modules come in two groups: Foundation Sciences of Public Health, and Public Health problems facing the developing world. Each module has a similar structure, and is populated by Open Educational Resources. Discussion forums are facilitated by expert volunteer tutors, who also mark assignments. A dissertation is required for the award of the MPH. The use of volunteer tutors allows costs to be kept low for students from developing countries.

In order to make sure that costs are low enough to be afforded by the target audience in developing countries, Peoples-uni has adopted a social enterprise model where volunteers underpin the educational programme and low fees are charged to cover modest infrastructure costs. Fees are $50 per module, or £1500 for the validated MPH course. Trustees oversee the organisation and an academic leadership group oversees academic aspects.

== Partnerships ==
Educational Quality Assurance is provided internally and through partnerships. The Master of Public Health programme is currently validated by Manchester Metropolitan University, and the UK Royal Society for Public Health is a strategic partner. Partnerships with other universities and organisations are being developed.

== Citations by independent sources ==
The educational innovation provided by the Peoples-uni has been recognised as having potential to help correct the unequal distribution of the global health workforce. The course team was awarded an online volunteering award in 2013. Reference has been made to Peoples-uni or its publications in peer reviewed publications including Health Education, PLoS ONE, International Journal of Productivity and Performance Management, Human Resources for Health, and Australia and New Zealand Health Policy.
