= Frederica Perera =

American environmental health scientist and researcher

Frederica Perera (born 1941) is an American environmental health scientist and the founder of the Columbia Center for Children's Environmental Health at the Columbia University Mailman School of Public Health. Her research career has focused on identifying and preventing harm to children from prenatal and early childhood exposure to environmental chemicals and pollutants. She is internationally recognized for pioneering the field of molecular epidemiology, incorporating molecular techniques into epidemiological studies to measure biologic doses, preclinical responses and susceptibility to toxic exposure.

== Biography ==
Born in Boston, Massachusetts, Perera received her bachelor's degree in Liberal Arts from Harvard University/Radcliffe College in 1963. She received her DrPH in Environmental Health Sciences from Columbia University in 1976 and a PhD in Environmental and Social Policy from Columbia University in 1981.

In 1982, Perera joined the faculty of Columbia University Mailman School of Public Health in the Department of Environmental Health Sciences. In 1998, she founded the Columbia Center for Children's Environmental Health to conduct community-based research on environmental risks to childhood's health.

=== Research ===
Since the late 1980s, Perera has led studies applying molecular and imaging techniques within longitudinal cohort studies of pregnant women and their children in the U.S., Poland, and China, with the goal of identifying preventable environmental risk factors for developmental disorders, asthma, obesity, and cancer in childhood. These exposures include toxic chemicals, pesticides, and air pollution, with particular focus on the adverse effects of prenatal and early childhood exposures. This research has revealed that the prenatal period of development is especially vulnerable to toxic environmental exposures and that prenatal exposures such as air pollutants, chemicals in plastics, pesticides and flame retardants are linked to neurodevelopmental problems, obesity and/or asthma in childhood. The research also found that stress and maternal hardship can increase the harm from chemical exposures. The research has demonstrated the benefits of policies and other interventions to reduce or eliminate such exposures.

In 1982, Perera co-authored a seminal paper that defined the nascent field of molecular epidemiology, which uses biomarkers such as DNA adducts to understand the links between environmental exposures and disease with the goal of prevention—an approach she uses in her own research. Perera was also among the first to report evidence that prenatal exposures to environmental toxicants result in adverse health outcomes in childhood and adolescence.

Perera has written extensively on the multiple threats to children's health and future well-being from fossil fuel combustion emissions, both from climate change and toxic air pollution, and the benefits of government action on health, the economy, and equity.

Research findings by Perera and colleagues have been used to support, pass, and enforce laws that protect environmental and public health. Through a longstanding partnership with WE ACT for Environmental Justice, the center's findings have been used to influence policy in the areas of air pollution, asthma initiatives, secondhand smoke, residential pesticides, and chemical reform.

Perera has received numerous honors, including the 20th Annual Heinz Award in the Environment for her lifetime achievement in research for the protection of children's health.
