= Peter Pharoah =

British public health professor (1934–2021)

- Born: Peter Oswald Derrick Pharoah; 19 May 1934; Ranchi, India
- Died: 23 October 2021 (aged 87)
- Spouse: Margaret Pharoah
- Children: Fiona; Paul; Mark; Timothy

Peter Oswald Derrick Pharoah (19 May 1934 – 23 October 2021) was a British public health professor at the University of Liverpool from 1979 until 1997. He was known for his work on people with cretinism (as the condition was then known) in Papua New Guinea and cerebral palsy in the United Kingdom.

== Early life ==
Peter Pharoah was born in Ranchi, in the Indian state of Jharkhand, in May 1934. He went to school in Lovedale and Sanawar.

In 1948, after his father died, he and his mother moved back to Britain. He studied at Palmer's School in Grays, Essex, before studying at St Mary's Hospital Medical School at Imperial College London, where he met his wife and ran in a team with Sir Roger Bannister.

== Medical work ==
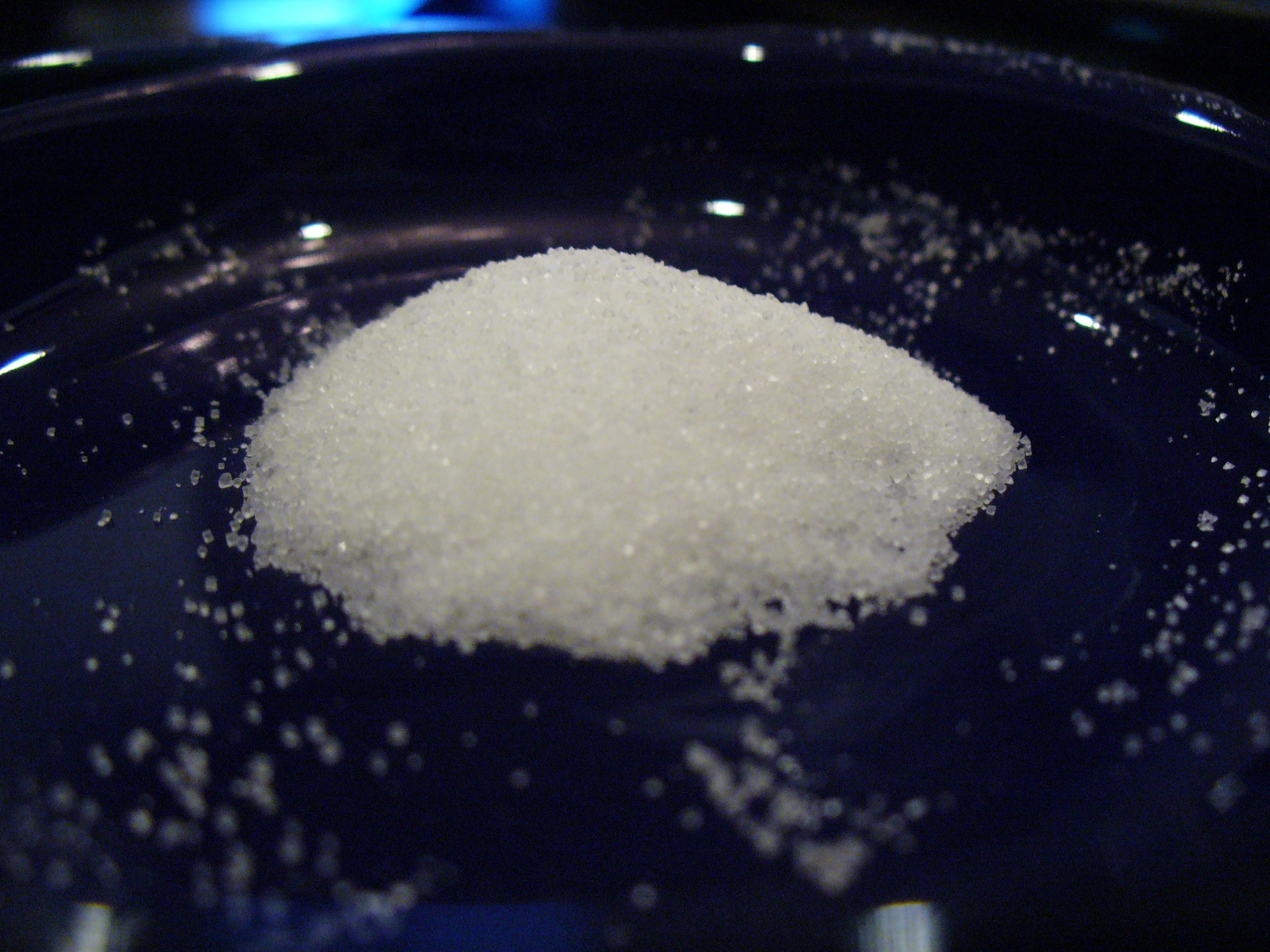
A pile of iodised salt

He married in 1960, moving three years later to Papua New Guinea to become a medical officer in Rabaul and the district medical officer in Mount Hagen, Wewak and Goroka. When working with villagers in the Jimi Valley, Pharoah ran a clinical trial whereby he injected iodised oil into women who were of child-bearing age and found out that cretinism (as congenital iodine deficiency syndrome was known at the time) was caused by iodine deficiency during pregnancy; this led to iodised salt being the only salt imported and thus the disease was eradicated.

In 1972, he moved back to the UK and became a lecturer at the London School of Hygiene and Tropical Medicine before becoming a professor of public health at the University of Liverpool in 1979. He worked on a number of cases regarding the life expectancy for children with cerebral palsy, including in many legal cases. His later research focused on health conditions that affected young children, such as heart defects and low birth weight, as well as the health concerns of newborns who had a vanishing twin.

He was an editor-in-chief of the International Journal of Epidemiology (1991–2000).

== Death ==
Pharoah, who had dementia later in life, died on 23 October 2021.
