= Stephen Leeder =

Stephen Leeder AO FRSN FAAHMS(born 13 December 1941) is an emeritus professor of public health and community medicine at the University of Sydney, where he was dean of medicine from 1997 to 2002. Leeder is an adjunct professor of public health at the Western Sydney University, an adjunct professor of epidemiology at the Columbia University Mailman School of Public Health in New York. He held the position as chair of the Western Sydney Local Health District Board from 2011–2016.

His research interests have focused on especially respiratory and cardiovascular disease and its prevention and care. On 1 January 2017, Leeder became co-editor-in-chief of the International Journal of Epidemiology for nine years. He was also the inaugural director of the Menzies Centre for Health Policy at the University of Sydney, which was renamed the Leeder Centre for Health Policy, Economics, and Data in his honour on 3 December 2024.

== Early life and education ==
Leeder was born in Grafton, New South Wales on 13 December 1941. He attended Homebush Boys High School and the University of Sydney, where he graduated with First Class Honours in Medical Science in 1964; and with Second Class Honours in medicine and surgery in 1966. As a Doctor of Philosophy in 1974 (his dissertation was entitled, "An epidemiological study of selected factors which may pre-dispose to chronic obstructive lung disease"), and as a Doctor of Medicine in 2006 (his dissertation was entitled, "Studies of factors that affect the lung function of children").

In 2016, he was awarded a Doctor of Medical Science degree by the University of Sydney for his thesis titled "Studies in the evolution, consequences and control of cardiovascular disease in Australia and Other countries". On 12 December 2024, he was awarded an Honorary Doctor of Medicine by the University of Newcastle in recognition of his foundational educational curriculum developments and local health research.

== Career ==
Leeder began his career as an intern at Royal North Shore Hospital in North Sydney in 1966. He started his clinical training as a Medical Officer at Tinsley Baptist Mission Hospital in Baiyer River, Papua New Guinea, in 1968. He subsequently returned to Royal North Shore Hospital as a Medical Registrar (1969) and Senior Medical Registrar (1970), followed by a role as Clinical Assistant in Thoracic Medicine (1971–1973) alongside an appointment as a Visiting Lecturer in Chronic Disease Epidemiology at the University of Sydney. Between 1971 and 1973, he completed a Ph.D project at the University of Sydney examining factors affecting the lung function of Sydney school children.

Leeder has a history of involvement in public health research, educational development and policy. His research interests as a clinical epidemiologist have been primarily asthma and cardiovascular disease. Leeder's interest in public health was piqued by spending 1968 in the highlands of Papua New Guinea.

After post-doctoral clinical epidemiological experience at St. Thomas’s Hospital in London (1974–75) and innovative medical education atMcMaster University in Canada (1975–76), he was appointed foundation professor of community medicine at the University of Newcastle (New South Wales) in 1976 and remained there until the end of 1985. Leeder played a role in the development of new and different medical curriculum and student assessment. He was foundation director of the Asian and Pacific Centre for Clinical Epidemiology. The Rockefeller Foundation awarded a grant to the University of Newcastle to establish the centre as part of the International Clinical Epidemiology Network (INCLEN) to the develop clinical epidemiological skills of middle-order clinicians as clinical epidemiologists in the in the Asia-Pacific region. Leeder was the director of a department of community medicine from 1986 to 1996. In Newcastle, his research interests at that times were cardiovascular disease, asthma and tobacco.

Leeder became Professor of Community Medicine at Westmead Hospital in western Sydney in 1986, and he and his group pursued research in heart disease and health promotion. His chair was originally in the Department of Community Medicine at the University of Sydney and then in the Department of Public Health and Community Medicine, which became the Sydney School of Public Health.

After serving for two years as head of the Department of Public Health and Community Medicine at the University of Sydney, Leeder was appointed dean of the Medical Faculty from 1996 to 2002. He oversaw the implementation of a new graduate-entry educational program, decentralization of the Faculty to its clinical schools, strategic development of research and the formation of an extensive rural-education network for medical students at Broken Hill, Dubbo and Northern Rivers. During this interval he contributed to several federal health initiatives including the National Better Health Commission.

After completing his term as dean, Leeder took study leave to work at Columbia University's Earth Institute with Jeffrey Sachs and the Mailman School of Public Health in 2003-04. He and his colleagues developed a report, based on research data and scientific interpretation, of the economic consequences of cardiovascular disease (CVD) in developing economies. The report, "A Race against Time: the challenge of cardiovascular disease in developing economies", focussed on the macroeconomic consequences of CVD—particularly on the fact that one-third of CVD deaths in many developing countries were occurring in people of working age.

After returning from New York in 2004, Leeder directed the development of the Sydney node of the Menzies Centre for Health Policy from 2006 to 2012. He was appointed an officer in the Order of Australia in 2004.

Leeder was appointed chair of the Western Sydney Local Health District Board from 2011 until 2016, and his career in western Sydney began in 1986. He returned to work at the Westmead Hospital at that time and was appointed as director of the Research and Education Network for the health district. It was a time of major development and redevelopment of facilities in the health district. An advocate for integrating care in the community with hospital services, he has advised federal and state governments on prevention and health service provision.

Leeder has served as an academic staff representative on the University of Sydney Senate for several terms, had two double terms as national president of the Public Health Association, and one triennium as chair of the Health Advisory Committee of the NHMRC. He was a member of the Better Health Commission in the development health goals and targets for Australia, and on the Scientific Advisory Committee and the Health and Hospitals Fund Advisory Board, directed the Western Sydney Local Health District's Research Network and chaired the New South Wales Advisory Committee on Prevention. Leeder was a member of the NSW Health Ministerial Advisory Committee from 2011 to 2014, and chaired the NSW State Committee of the Royal Australasian College of Physicians in 2012 and 2013. He has contributed for over forty years in mainstream media, medical newspapers and on television. Leeder was elected a Fellow of the Australian Academy of Health and Medical Sciences in 2018. He is also an elected Fellow of the Royal Society of New South Wales (FRSN).

== Professional Fellowships ==
Throughout his career, Leeder has been elected to professional fellowships. He was first elected a Fellow of the Royal Australasian College of Physicians (FRACP) in 1975, followed by his election to the UK Faculty of Public Health Medicine in 1983. He later became a fellow of the Australasian Faculty of Public Health Medicine in 1991, and in 2007, he was conferred as an Honorary Fellow of the Australian College of General Practitioners.

== Awards and honors ==
In addition to his appointment as an Officer of the Order of Australia (AO), Leeder has received several major awards throughout his career. In 2009, he was honored with both the Sidney Sax Medal from the Australian Healthcare and Hospitals Association (AHHA) and the Sidney Sax Public Health Medal from the Public Health Association of Australia (PHAA). He was subsequently awarded the BUPA Advocacy Award in 2011. More recently, on 12 December 2024, he was awarded an Honorary Doctor of Medicine degree by the University of Newcastle, followed by his election as a fellow of the Royal Society of New South Wales (FRSN) in 2025.

== Personal life ==
Leeder lives in Sydney and Wentworth Falls, and is married to Dr. Katharine Esson. He has three children: Nicholas Leeder, Robert Leeder, and James Leeder. Leeder published a book of his poems, Pilgrim Soul, in 2024.
