= Cabo Junio Amaral =

Brazilian politician

Junio Amaral
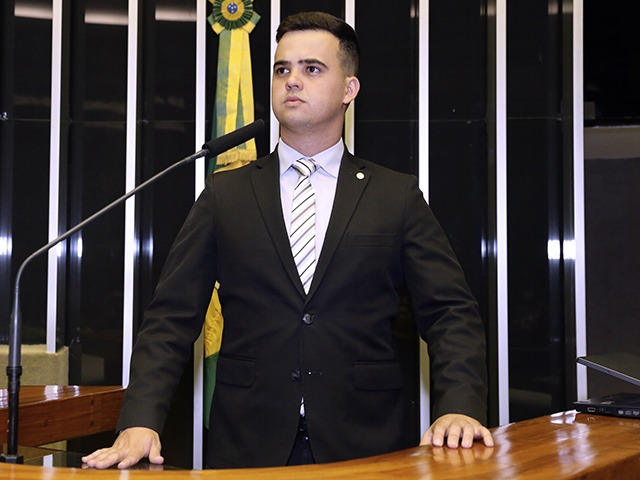

Member of the Chamber of Deputies
- Incumbent
- Assumed office 1 January 2019
- Constituency: Minas Gerais

Personal details
- Born: Geraldo Junio do Amarala; 30 June 1987 (age 39) Belo Horizonte, Minas Gerais, Brazil
- Party: PL (since 2022)
- Other political affiliations: PSL (2018–2022)
- Spouse: Marília Amaral

Military service
- Allegiance: Brazil
- Branch/service: Military Police of Minas Gerais State
- Rank: Corporal

Geraldo Junio do Amaral (born 30 June 1987) more commonly known as Cabo Junio Amaral is a Brazilian military figure and politician. He has spent his political career representing his home state of Minas Gerais, having served as state representative since 2015.

== Personal life ==
Amaral is a corporal in the Brazilian military police. Amaral is married.

== Political career ==
Amaral was the most voted candidate for the chamber of deputies in the state of Minas Gerais, receiving 158.541 votes or 1.57% of all the valid ballots. Since being elected Amaral has served as the vice-president of the PSL and its coalition members in the lower house of the Brazilian parliament.

He is a close ideological and political ally to Jair and Eduardo Bolsonaro.
