= Donald L. Patrick =

American social scientist

Donald Lee Patrick
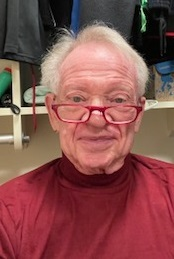
- Born: 23 September 1944 (age 82); Eugene, Oregon
- Occupations: Social scientist, academic, and author

Academic background
- Education: AB, MSPH, and PhD
- Alma mater: Northwestern University; Columbia University

Donald L. Patrick is a social scientist, academic, and an author. He is a professor emeritus of Health Systems and Population Health at the University of Washington.

Patrick's research spans the fields of public health, chronic illness, public health policy, outcomes research, quality of life, health status assessment.

Patrick is a member of National Academy of Medicine, and was the first president of International Society for Quality of Life Research.

== Education ==
Patrick graduated from the Northwestern University with a major in Psychology in 1966. Subsequently, he attended Columbia University, completed his MSPH degree in 1968, and graduated with a Ph.D. degree in Public Health in 1972.

== Career ==
After obtaining his PhD, Patrick held a series of short-term appointments, first as a Research Sociologist at New York University and then at the University of California. He was then appointed lecturer in Public Health and Instructor for Sociology of Medical Care in the Department of Epidemiology and Public Health and Institution for Social and Policy Studies at Yale University. In 1976, he moved to the United Kingdom where he was appointed senior lecturer in Social Science and Head of the Social Science Section in the Department of Community Medicine, St Thomas's Hospital Medical School, London. In 1982, he joined the Department of Social Medicine at the University of North Carolina as an associate professor and then, in 1987, was appointed full professor in the School of Public Health and Director of the Program in Social and Behavioral Sciences at the University of Washington.He also held adjunct appointments in the Department of Rehabilitation Medicine and School of Pharmacy. He retired as Emeritus Professor in 2006.

== Research and work ==
Patrick partook in a WHO project focused on the development of QOL measuring instrument. The particular features of the planned instrument (WHOQOL), and the study protocol was reported in 1993. Later on, in a 1998 research paper by WHOQOL Group, he developed final-trial version of instrument entitled, "WHOQOL-100".

Patrick has also conducted research on evaluating the quality of death, and exploring the measure of the quality of the dying. In one of his research studies, he designed and supervised after-death interviews with the family members of the deceased since the research findings can be utilized for the improvement of near-death care, and experience of the dying patients.

Patrick has conducted outcomes research, focused on vulnerable populations, chronic illness, as well as end of life care. In a Delphi study, a consensus was reached over the taxonomy, and terminology of the measures aimed at patient-reported outcomes (PRO) based on health. Having focused on the PRO, he also determined the content validity on the PRO instruments aimed for the use in medical product evaluation.

== Awards and honors ==
- 1993 – Elected inaugural president, International Society for Quality of Life Research
- 1995 – Elected member, National Academy of Medicine
- 2001 – President's Award, International Society for Quality of Life Research
- 2012 – Avedis Donabedian Lifetime Achievement Award, International Society for Pharmacoeconomics and Outcomes Research

== Bibliography ==
=== Books ===
- Long-Term Effects of War-Related Deprivation On Health: A Report On The Evidence. 1981.
- Sociology as Applied To Medicine. 1982. ISBN 9780702008993.
- Disablement in The Community. 1989. ISBN 9780192614346.
- Health Status and Health Policy: Quality of Life in Health Care Evaluation and Resource Allocation. 1993. ISBN 9780195050271.
- Hope or Hype: The Obsession With Medical Advances and The High Cost of False Promises. 2005. ISBN 9780814408452.

=== Selected articles ===
- Patrick, D. L.; Deyo, R. A. (1989). "Generic and disease-specific measures in assessing health status and quality of life". Medical Care. 27 (3 Suppl): S217–S232. doi:10.1097/00005650-198903001-00018. PMID 2646490.
- Patrick, D. L.; Erickson, P. (1993). Health Status and Health Policy: Quality of Life in Health Care Evaluation and Resource Allocation. Oxford University Press.
- Guyatt, G. H.; Feeny, D. H.; Patrick, D. L. (1993). "Measuring health-related quality of life". Annals of Internal Medicine. 118 (8): 622–629. doi:10.7326/0003-4819-118-8-199304150-00009. PMID 8452328.
- Patrick, D. L.; Cheadle, A.; Thompson, D. C.; Diehr, P.; Koepsell, T.; Kinne, S. (1994). "The validity of self-reported smoking: A review and meta-analysis". American Journal of Public Health. 84 (7): 1086–1093. doi:10.2105/AJPH.84.7.1086. PMC 1614767. PMID 8017530.
- Andresen, E. M.; Malmgren, J. A.; Carter, W. B.; Patrick, D. L. (1994). "Screening for depression in well older adults: Evaluation of a short form of the CES-D". American Journal of Preventive Medicine. 10 (2): 77–84. doi:10.1016/S0749-3797(18)30622-6.
- Mokkink, L. B.; Terwee, C. B.; Patrick, D. L.; Alonso, J.; Stratford, P. W.; Knol, D. L.; de Vet, H. C. (2010). "The COSMIN study reached international consensus on taxonomy, terminology, and definitions of measurement properties for health-related patient-reported outcomes". Journal of Clinical Epidemiology. 63 (7): 737–745. doi:10.1016/j.jclinepi.2010.02.006. PMID 20494804.
- Mokkink, L. B.; Terwee, C. B.; Patrick, D. L.; Alonso, J.; Stratford, P. W.; Knol, D. L.; de Vet, H. C. (2010). "The COSMIN checklist for assessing the methodological quality of studies on measurement properties of health status measurement instruments: An international Delphi study". Quality of Life Research. 19 (4): 539–549. doi:10.1007/s11136-010-9606-8. PMC 2852520. PMID 20169472.
