= Karoline Amaral =

Brazilian model

- Born: June 29, 1984 (age 42); Brasília, DF, Brazil
- Modeling information
- Height: 5 ft 10 in (1.78 m)
- Hair color: Brown
- Eye color: Green

Karoline Amaral (born June 29, 1984) is a Brazilian model. She has been the face of brands such as Boss, Emporio Armani, Erreuno, Iceberg, and Roberta Scarpa and has done more than 100 shows in various fashion weeks.

Her model agencies are: Modelwerk, Why Not Model Agency, Nass Model Mgmt, and Premier.
