= Anthony Amaral =

American historian and horse trainer (1930–1982)

Anthony August Amaral
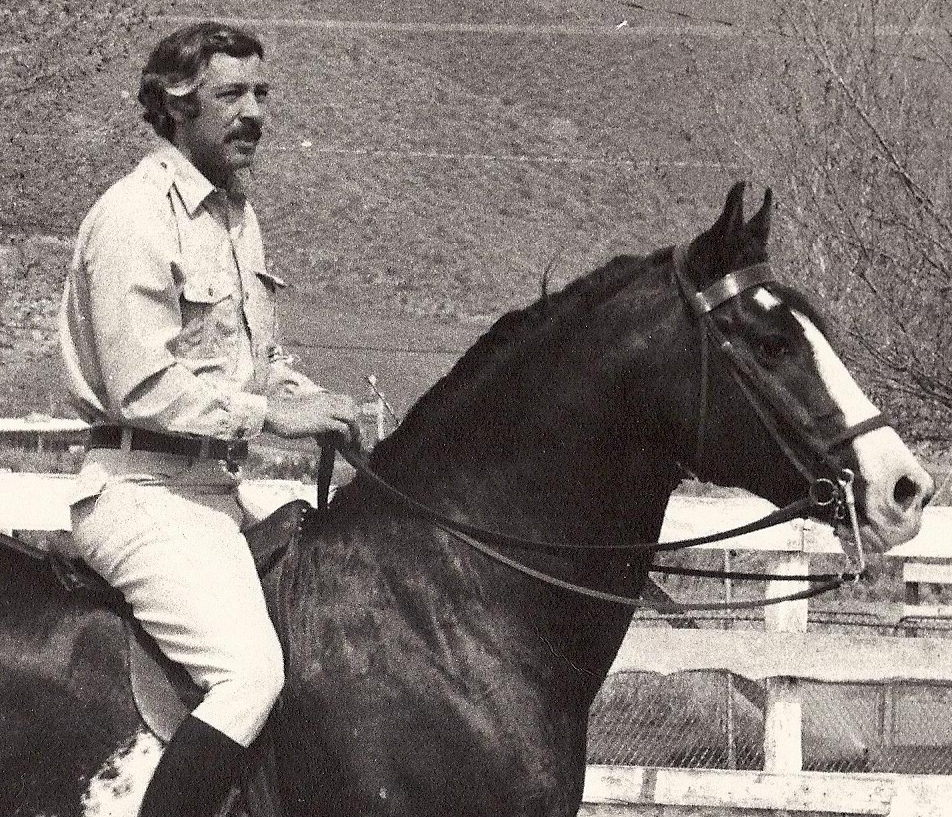
- Anthony Amaral around 1972
- Born: August 19, 1930; Yonkers, New York, US
- Died: June 9, 1982 (aged 51); Carson City, Nevada, US
- Occupations: Author, librarian
- Spouse: Loretta Anne Richey

Anthony Amaral (19 August 1930 – 9 June 1982) was an American West Historian and horse trainer. He wrote books and articles on movie and feral horses, as well a biography of Western novelist and artist Will James.

== Biography ==
=== Personal life ===
Amaral was born in New York, but moved to Carson City, Nevada at an early age. He served in the U.S. Army in the early 1950s during the Korean War, where he reached the rank of 1st Lieut. After his discharge, he attended California State Polytechnic University, Pomona then stayed on as a horse trainer at the W. K. Kellogg Arabian Horse Center. His first known published article was about the Center. He married Loretta Anne Richey in 1965 in Napa California; was later divorced in 1971, in Carson City, Nevada.

=== Death and afterward ===
Amaral died in 1982 "fighting down a stallion at the end of a rope". His collections on Will James are now archived in the University of Nevada Reno Library. The library also has a collection of his photographs.

== Philosophical and/or political views ==
Amaral advocated non-abusive means for filming horse stunts in movies, and wrote several articles protesting the harassment of wild (feral) horses.

== Published works ==
1. Corn Flake Legacy Horse Lovers Magazine April–May 1959 p. 32-33.
2. Comanche: The Horse that Survived the Custer Massacre. Los Angeles: Westernlore Press. 1961.
3. Motion picture horses. Cruse Publishing Co., [1962]
4. New Kellogg's Pony Breed by Anthony A. Amaral In Western Horseman, February 1962, pp. 74–77
5. Struggle in Owen's Valley American Forests Magazine August, 1964
6. The Flume Riders True West, April 1966, pp. 24–25
7. Movie horses: their treatment and training; Bobbs-Merrill- (1967)
8. Movie Horses : The Fascinating Techniques of Training WILSHIRE BOOK COMPANY (1967)
9. Will James, the Gilt Edged Cowboy. Los Angeles: Westernlore Press. 1967.
10. Idah Meacham Strobridge, First Woman of Nevada Letters Nevada State Historical Society, Fall 1967.
11. A Dedication to the Memory of Will James 1892–1942; University of Arizona Press: Arizona and the West, Autumn, 1968 pp. 206–210
12. Wagons By Studebaker by Anthony A. Amaral In Old West, June 1968, pp. 56–61
13. Walter Van Tilburg Clark : the writer as teacher Sage. Vol. 2, no. 3 (Winter 1968) pp. 10–15.
14. The Wild Stallion: Comments on His Natural History; A. Amaral - Brand Book, 1969.
15. The Story of Frank Hopkins, Western Horseman Magazine, 1969
16. Movie Horses Old West, March 1970, pp. 6–21
17. The Wild Horse - Worth Saving? by Anthony Amaral National Parks and Conservation, March, 1971 pp. 21–24
18. Threat to the Free Spirit: The Question of the Mustang's Future The American West September 1971, pp. 13–17.
19. Lace curtains and Bootjacks, Old Carson City's Ormsby House [Carson City, Nev.] : Ormsby House, ©1972.
20. The Importance of Disposition by Anthony A. Amaral In Western Horseman, April, 1974
21. Quest for Arabian horses became a desert odyssey Smithsonian Magazine, September 1975 pp. 42–49
22. Mustang: Life and Legends of Nevada's Wild Horses. Reno: University of Nevada Press. 1977.
23. Statement by Anthony Amaral, Author and Librarian Proceedings National Wild Horse Forum April 4-7-1977 p. 66.
24. Selective Major Literature Relating to Wild Horses Proceedings National Wild Horse Forum April 4-7-1977 pp. 68–9.
25. How to train your horse. A complete guide to making an honest horse. A. Amaral - New York : Winchester Press, ©1977.
26. The West of Will James: A Portfolio of His Drawings; W James, A.A. Amaral - 1978 - University of Nevada Press
27. Spirit Horse Far West. Vol. 2, no. 2. 1979, pp. 24–41.
28. Will James, the Last Cowboy Legend. Reno: University of Nevada Press. 1992 [1980]. ISBN 9780874171907.
