= Marília Amaral =

Brazilian politician (born 1999)

Member of the Legislative Assembly of Minas Gerais
- Incumbent
- Assumed office 1 February 2027

Personal details
- Born: 21 January 1999 (age 27)
- Party: Liberal Party
- Spouse: Cabo Junio Amaral

Marília Feliciano de Souza Amaral (born 21 January 1999) is a Brazilian politician who was elected member of the Legislative Assembly of Minas Gerais in 2026. She is the chairwoman of the women's wing of the Liberal Party in Contagem. She is married to Cabo Junio Amaral.
