= Walter W. Holland =

Epidemiologist and physician (1929–2018)

Walter Werner Holland
- Born: 5 March 1929; Teplice-Sanov, Czechoslovakia
- Died: 9 February 2018 (aged 88); London
- Citizenship: British
- Occupation: Epidemiologist

Academic background
- Education: St Thomas's Hospital Medical School

Academic work
- Discipline: Epidemiology
- Institutions: St Thomas's Hospital Medical School

Walter Werner Holland (5 March 1929 – 9 February 2018) was an epidemiologist and public health physician.

== Life ==
Holland was born on 5 March 1929 in Teplice-Sanov, Czechoslovakia, part of the German-speaking Sudetenland, to a Jewish family. His parents were Henry Holland and Hertha Zentner. With the rise of Hitler the family fled to England in 1939, just in time. His grandfather who remained in Czechoslovakia died shortly afterwards but his grandmother was deported to Theresienstadt (Terezín) concentration camp where she perished.

He attended Rugby School and then went to St Thomas's Hospital Medical School where he qualified in medicine in 1954, having obtained a first degree in Physiology. He served in the Royal Air Force, attached to the Epidemiological Research Laboratory at Colindale, North London and, after a further appointment as Lecturer to the Department of Medicine at St Thomas's, he was made MRC Clinical Research Fellow in the Department of Epidemiology and Medical Statistics at the London School of Hygiene and Tropical Medicine. This was followed by a year in the Department of Epidemiology at Johns Hopkins School of Hygiene and then his return to St Thomas's in 1962 and his appointment to Professor in 1968.

It was at St. Thomas's that Holland developed his academic reputation. He was appointed Chair of Clinical Epidemiology and Social Medicine and established the Department of Community Medicine. He subsequently established the associated Health Services Research Unit with core funding from the Department of Health. He assembled a large staff including epidemiologists, social scientists and statisticians. They conducted a large number of studies on epidemiology of chronic respiratory disease, blood pressure, smoking, air pollution and the application of epidemiologic principles to health services research. He established strong links with fellow public health researchers in the United States, Australia and Japan.

He retired as Emeritus Professor of Public Health Medicine in 1994 and was appointed Visiting Professor at London School of Economics.

== Work ==
Holland has had a very wide contribution to the development of epidemiology and public health. His groundbreaking paper on validation of medical screening procedures, published jointly with fellow epidemiologist Archie Cochrane in 1971, became a classic in the field.

== Legacy ==
The London School of Economics established two prizes in his honour. These are the Walter Holland Prize for Best Dissertation and the Walter Holland Prize for Best Overall Performance which are awarded annually to MSc Global Health Policy students.

== Some publications ==
=== Books ===
- Holland, WW. Improving Health Services, Background, Methods and Applications. Edward Elgar, Cheltenham 2013,1-271
- Holland WW, Olsen J, Florey C du V. The Development of Modern Epidemiology. Oxford University Press, London
- Holland WW. Screening in disease prevention : what works? 2005.
- Alin, S., Mossialos E, McKee M & Holland WW. Making decisions on public health: a review of eight countries. 2004
- Detels R, Holland WW, McEwen J, Omenn GS. Oxford Textbook of Public Health, 3rd edition. 1997
- Holland WW, Stewart S. Screening in Health Care. Benefit of Bane? Nuffield Provincial Hospitals Trust, London 1990

=== Articles ===
- Capewell, S., McCarney, M., & Holland, WW. NHS Health Checks—a naked emperor? Journal of Public Health, 2015
- Holland, WW. Public health coming home. Journal of Public Health, 2015
- Holland, WW. Lessons from the past. International Journal of Health Planning and Management, 2014,
- Holland, WW. How to improve our health services, Clinical medicine (London, England), 2014
- Holland, WW. Austerity: A failed experiment on the people of Europe. Clinical medicine (London, England). 2012.
- Holland, WW. Measuring the quality of medical care. Journal of Health Services Research & Policy, 2009.
- Holland WW. Healthcare for London. Clinical medicine (London, England), 2008
- Holland, WW. Healthcare for London: A Framework for Action. Clinical medicine (London, England), 2008
- Holland, WW. Public health epidemiology in the health technology assessment: risks and opportunities. European Journal of Public Health, 2007.
- Holland, WW, Stewart, S & Masseria, C. Policy Brief: Screening in Europe. 2006.
- Allin S, Mossialos E, McKee M, Holland WW. The Wanless report and decision-making in public health. Journal of Public Health, 2005.
- Holland WW. Health technology assessment and public health: A commentary. International Journal of Technology Assessment in Health Care. 2004
- Holland, WW (2000). "Public health–the vision and the challenge. An attempt to analyse the issues and possible solutions". Journal of Epidemiology. 10 (4): 200–15. doi:10.2188/jea.10.200. PMID 10959602.
- Holland, WW (1999). "What should be the concerns of epidemiology?". International Journal of Epidemiology. 28 (5): S1009–11. doi:10.1093/oxfordjournals.ije.a019902. PMID 10598006.
- Epstein, FH; Holland, WW (1983). "Prevention of chronic diseases in the community–one-disease versus multiple-disease strategies". International Journal of Epidemiology. 12 (2): 135–7. doi:10.1093/ije/12.2.135. PMID 6874205.
- Cochrane, AL; Holland, WW (1971). "Validation of screening procedures". British Medical Bulletin. 27 (1): 3–8. doi:10.1093/oxfordjournals.bmb.a070810. PMID 5100948.

== Awards ==
- 1980-82 President, Section of Epidemiology and Community Medicine, Royal Society of Medicine
- 1985 chairman, Society for Social Medicine
- 1987–90 President, International Epidemiological Association
- 1989-1992 President, Faculty of Community Medicine/Public Health Medicine of the UK Royal College of Physicians in 1989.
- 1981 Awarded Doctor Honoris Causa, University of Bordeaux
- 1985 Elected Honorary Member, American Epidemiological Society
- 1989 Awarded Salomon Neumann Medal by German Society of Social Medicine
- 1989 Awarded Medal of Distinction by the University of Pavia
- 1990 Awarded Doctor Honoris Causa, University of Berlin
- 1991 Elected "Hero of Public Health" by Johns Hopkins University School of Hygiene
- 1992 Awarded CBE
- 1993 Honorary Member Society for Social Medicine
