= Society for Social Medicine =

UK research organization

Society for Social Medicine & Population Health
- Abbreviation: SocSocMed
- Formation: 1956
- Founded at: London
- Purpose: To promote Population Health research
- Website: www.socsocmed.org.uk

The Society for Social Medicine (SSM) is the primary organization for researchers in social, community, and public health in the UK and Ireland, founded in London in 1956. The society was renamed the Society for Social Medicine and Population Health. It is affiliated with the European Public Health Association and is a member of the International Epidemiological Association's European Epidemiology Federation.
