= Amaral (footballer, born 1983) =

Brazilian footballer

Personal information
- Full name: Carlos Rafael do Amaral
- Date of birth: 28 November 1983 (age 42)
- Place of birth: Mogi Mirim, Brazil
- Height: 1.75 m (5 ft 9 in)
- Position: Defensive midfielder

Youth career
- 2001–2002: Paulista

Senior career*
Years	Team	Apps	(Gls)
2003	Paulista	15	(3)
2003	Ituano		
2004–2005	Paulista		
2005	→ Vasco da Gama (loan)	17	(0)
2006	Paulista		
2006–2009	Vasco da Gama	73	(3)
2008	→ Grêmio (loan)	12	(0)
2010	Cerezo Osaka	32	(5)
2011	América-MG	32	(1)
2012–2013	Cruzeiro		
2012	→ Botafogo (loan)		
2013	→ Criciúma (loan)		
2014	Ceará		
2015	Passo Fundo		
- * Club domestic league appearances and goals

Carlos Rafael do Amaral or simply Amaral (born 28 November 1983), is a Brazilian former football defensive midfielder.

== Club statistics ==
As of 21 November 2009

Club performance			League		Cup		League Cup		Continental		Total	
Season	Club	League	Apps	Goals	Apps	Goals	Apps	Goals	Apps	Goals	Apps	Goals
Brazil			League		Copa do Brasil		League Cup		South America		Total	
2005	Vasco da Gama	Série A	17	0	—	—	—	—	—	—	17	0
2006	Vasco da Gama	Série A	13	1	—	—	—	—	1	0	14	1
2007	Vasco da Gama	Série A	33	1	4	0	8	0	5	0	50	1
2008	Vasco da Gama	Série A	—	—	2	0	8	0	—	—	10	0
2009	Vasco da Gama	Série B	27	1	8	0	15	0	—	—	50	1
Japan			League		Emperor's Cup		League Cup		Asia		Total	
2010	Cerezo Osaka	J1 League	32	5					—	—	32	5
Total	Brazil		90	3	14	0	31	0	6	0	141	3
Total	Japan		32	5							32	5
Career total			122	8	14	0	31	0	0	6	173	8

== Honours ==
- Brazilian Série C: 2003
- Brazilian Cup: 2005
- Campeonato Brasileiro Série B: 2009
