= André Amaral =

Luso-British epidemiologist

- Education: University of the Azores, Autonomous University of Madrid
- Known for: work on causes of chronic obstructive pulmonary disease and small lungs
- Scientific career
- Fields: Epidemiology
- Workplaces: Imperial College London, former: Centro Nacional de Investigaciones Oncológicas

André Amaral is an epidemiologist. He is associate professor of Respiratory Epidemiology and Global Health at Imperial College London and Chair of the Epidemiology Group of the European Respiratory Society. His research focuses on the causes of poor lung function, small lung syndrome, and chronic obstructive pulmonary disease (COPD), where he has been improving the understanding of the risks posed to the lungs by environmental, occupational and lifestyle factors. He has been investigating whether these risks vary across different ethnicities and world regions, as well as whether changes in sex hormone levels have an impact on lung function.

During his time at the Spanish National Cancer Centre (Centro Nacional de Investigaciones Oncológicas), he studied the role of selenium in the prevention of cancer.

== Significant publications ==
- Ma, Jixuan; Burney, Peter G J; Mannino, David M; Janson, Christer; Gíslason, Thorarinn; Obaseki, Daniel O; Jõgi, Rain; Santofimio, Valentina Quintero; Potts, James; Rashid, Abdul; Erhabor, Gregory E; Nielsen, Rune; Kocabas, Ali; Nafees, Asaad; Ahmed, Rana; Denguezli, Meriam; Barbara, Cristina; Cardoso, Joao; Dias, Herminia Brites; Rodrigues, Fátima; Agarwal, Dhiraj; Juvekar, Sanjay; Franssen, Frits M E; Seemungal, Terence; Mortimer, Kevin; El Biaze, Mohammed; Mahesh, Padukudru Anand; Koul, Parvaiz; Studnicka, Michael; Amaral, Andre F S (18 September 2026). "Generational changes in lung function in adults from several world regions: results from the Burden of Obstructive Lung Disease study". Thorax: thorax–2026–225173. doi:10.1136/thorax-2026-225173. hdl:10400.21/23170. PMID 42760129.
- Janson, Christer; Potts, James; Malinovschi, Andrei; Agarwal, Dhiraj; Ahmed, Rana; Aquart-Stewart, Althea; Harrabi, Imed; Denguezli, Meriam; Devereux, Graham; Erhabor, Gregory E; Gislason, Thorarinn; Jogi, Rain; Juvekar, Sanjay K; Knox-Brown, Ben; Koul, Parvaiz; Mortimer, Kevin; Nafees, Asaad Ahmed; Nielsen, Rune; Mahesh, Padukudru Anand; Paraguas, Stefanni Nonna M; Rotevatn, Anders Ørskov; Sooronbaev, Talant; Burney, Peter G J; Amaral, Andre F S (January 2025). "Lung function and onset of cardiometabolic diseases in the longitudinal Burden of Obstructive Lung Disease study". BMJ Open Respiratory Research. 12 (1) e002442. doi:10.1136/bmjresp-2024-002442. hdl:20.500.11815/7758. PMC 11751964. PMID 39832891.
- Santofimio, Valentina Quintero; Knox-Brown, Ben; Potts, James; Bartlett-Pestell, Samuel; Feary, Johanna; Amaral, Andre F. S. (1 October 2024). "Small Airways Obstruction and Mortality: Findings From the UK Biobank". Chest. 166 (4): 712–720. doi:10.1016/j.chest.2024.04.016. PMC 11492227. PMID 38797279.
- Amaral, Andre F S; Potts, James; Knox-Brown, Ben; Bagkeris, Emmanouil; Harrabi, Imed; Cherkaski, Hamid Hacene; Agarwal, Dhiraj; Juvekar, Sanjay; Anand, Mahesh Padukudru; Gislason, Thorarinn; Nafees, Asaad Ahmed; Mortimer, Kevin; Janson, Christer; Loh, Li Cher; Paraguas, Stefanni Nonna; Denguezli, Meriam; Al Ghobain, Mohammed; Mannino, David; Njoroge, Martin W; Devereux, Graham; Seemungal, Terence; Barbara, Cristina; Kocabaş, Ali; Ahmed, Rana; Aquart-Stewart, Althea; Studnicka, Michael; Welte, Tobias; Tan, Wan C; van Zyl-Smit, Richard N; Koul, Parvaiz; Garcia-Larsen, Vanessa; Minelli, Cosetta; Buist, A Sonia; Burney, Peter; the BOLD Study Collaborative Network (1 December 2023). "Cohort Profile: Burden of Obstructive Lung Disease (BOLD) study". International Journal of Epidemiology. 52 (6): e364–e373. doi:10.1093/ije/dyad146. hdl:20.500.11815/4557. PMC 10749748. PMID 37862437.
- Knox-Brown, Ben; Potts, James; Santofimio, Valentina Quintero; Minelli, Cosetta; Patel, Jaymini; Abass, Najlaa Mohammed; Agarwal, Dhiraj; Ahmed, Rana; Mahesh, Padukudru Anand; Bs, Jayaraj; Denguezli, Meriam; Franssen, Frits; Gislason, Thorarinn; Janson, Christer; Juvekar, Sanjay K; Koul, Parvaiz; Malinovschi, Andrei; Nafees, Asaad Ahmed; Nielsen, Rune; Paraguas, Stefanni Nonna M; Buist, Sonia; Burney, Peter GJ; Amaral, Andre F S (November 2023). "Isolated small airways obstruction predicts future chronic airflow obstruction: a multinational longitudinal study". BMJ Open Respiratory Research. 10 (1) e002056. doi:10.1136/bmjresp-2023-002056. hdl:20.500.11815/7389. PMC 10660204. PMID 37989490.
- Amaral, André F. S.; Patel, Jaymini; Kato, Bernet S.; Obaseki, Daniel O.; Lawin, Hervé; Tan, Wan C.; Juvekar, Sanjay K.; Harrabi, Imed; Studnicka, Michael; Wouters, Emiel F. M.; Loh, Li-Cher; Bateman, Eric D.; Mortimer, Kevin; Buist, A. Sonia; Burney, Peter G. J.; for the Burden of Obstructive Lung Disease (BOLD) Collaborative Research Group (1 March 2018). "Airflow Obstruction and Use of Solid Fuels for Cooking or Heating. BOLD (Burden of Obstructive Lung Disease) Results". American Journal of Respiratory and Critical Care Medicine. 197 (5): 595–610. doi:10.1164/rccm.201701-0205OC. PMC 6005234. PMID 28895752.
- Amaral, André F. S.; Strachan, David P.; Burney, Peter G. J.; Jarvis, Deborah L. (1 May 2017). "Female Smokers Are at Greater Risk of Airflow Obstruction Than Male Smokers. UK Biobank". American Journal of Respiratory and Critical Care Medicine. 195 (9): 1226–1235. doi:10.1164/rccm.201608-1545OC. PMID 28075609.
- Amaral, André F. S.; Coton, Sonia; Kato, Bernet; Tan, Wan C.; Studnicka, Michael; Janson, Christer; Gislason, Thorarinn; Mannino, David; Bateman, Eric D.; Buist, Sonia; Burney, Peter G. J. (30 September 2015). "Tuberculosis associates with both airflow obstruction and low lung function: BOLD results". European Respiratory Journal. 46 (4): 1104–1112. doi:10.1183/13993003.02325-2014. PMC 4594762. PMID 26113680.
