= International Journal of Productivity and Performance Management =

- Discipline: Performance management and measurement
- Language: English
- Edited by: Nicky Shaw, Luisa Huatuco

Publication details
- Former name: Work Study
- History: 1952–present
- Publisher: Emerald Group Publishing
- Frequency: 8/year
- Impact factor: 3.1 (2022)

Standard abbreviations
- ISO 4: Int. J. Product. Perform. Manag.

Indexing
- ISSN: 1741-0401
- LCCN: 2005204237
- OCLC no.: 54312680

Links
- Journal homepage; Online access

The International Journal of Productivity and Performance Management is a peer-reviewed academic journal covering performance management and measurement. The editors-in-chief are Dr Nicky Shaw and Dr Luisa Huatuco. The journal was established in 1952 and is published by Emerald Group Publishing. It is the official journal of the World Confederation of Productivity Science.
