= Carlos do Amaral Freire =

Brazilian scholar, linguist and translator

Carlos do Amaral Freire (Dom Pedrito, 27 October 1931 – 17 October 2020) was a Brazilian scholar, linguist and translator. Renowned for his linguistic prowess, Freire mastered more than 30 languages. He had the theoretical and practical knowledge necessary to communicate in these languages, and he was capable of translating, reading, and writing in them. Throughout his life, he studied over 120 languages, although he had half-forgotten many of them, requiring some review to regain conversational proficiency. Despite this, he continued to study two new languages each year.

Freire's Babel de Poemas is an anthology featuring translations of poems from 60 languages. It was inspired by the book in Esperanto Diverskolora Bukedeto, authored by František Lorenz.

== Publications ==
- Babel de Poemas (ISBN 85-254-1351-8)
- Los fonemas oclusivos y africados del aymara y del georgiano: un estudio contrastivo
