= International Epidemiological Association =

- Formation: 1954; 72 years ago
- Type: Professional association
- Purpose: "To bring together physicians and communities to improve the nation’s health."
- Headquarters: Chicago, Illinois, U.S.
- Official language: English
- President: Henrique Barros
- Website: ieaweb.org

The International Epidemiological Association (IEA) is a worldwide association with more than 2000 members in over 100 different countries, who follow the aims of the association to facilitate communication amongst those engaged in research and teaching of epidemiology throughout the world, and to encourage its use in all fields of health including social, community and preventative medicine. These aims are achieved by holding scientific meetings and seminars, by publication of journals, reports, translations of books, by contact amongst members and by other activities consistent with these aims. Members are accepted without regard to race, religion, sex, political affiliation or country of origin.

The association publishes its own Journal, the International Journal of Epidemiology (IJE), which is published bi-monthly, a complimentary copy of which is included in the membership dues. It also sponsors a number of publications such as A Dictionary of Epidemiology, and The Development of Modern Epidemiology. In addition, the association organizes The World Congress of Epidemiology (WCE), which is held triennially in different parts of the world. The 19th WCE was held in Edinburgh, Scotland, August 2011, while the 20th WCE will be held in Anchorage, Alaska, August 2014. Regional Scientific Meetings are also held in the IEA regions during three-year periods between WCEs.

The IEA is in official relations with the World Health Organization (WHO) and is run by a council including executive and regional councilors for its seven regions in addition to the ex-officio members.

== Aims ==
The objectives of the IEA are to:

- Promote the use of epidemiology and its application to the solution of health problems.
- Encourage the development of epidemiological methods and improvement in these methods.
- Promote the communication of epidemiological methods and findings amongst epidemiologists throughout the world as well as amongst all others concerned with health.
- Co-operate with both national and international organisations which are concerned with the promotion of health in the application of epidemiological methods in the solution of problems.
- Improve the dissemination of epidemiological findings nationally and internationally.
- Improve the recruitment, education and training of epidemiologists.

These objectives are achieved through networking professionals working in the field of epidemiology through different means, including its website: www.IEAweb.org Home; holding national, regional and international scientific meetings and congresses, as well as individual contacts between professional members. These have guided IEA's activities over the years.

A determined effort was made in this decade to develop regional activities and to strengthen IEA links and co-operation with the WHO.

== Founding ==
The International Corresponding Club, as the IEA was first called, was started in 1954 by John Pemberton of Great Britain and Harold N Willard of the United States with the advice and help of Robert Cruickshank. They had found, as traveling Research Fellows each in the other's country, that they were handicapped by not being sufficiently well informed about the research and teaching in the field of social and preventive medicine in the various medical schools and research institutes. Initially it was to try and remedy this defect, that the Club was established on a small and informal basis. At first it was just a corresponding club whose object was "to facilitate the communication between physicians working for the most part in university departments of preventive and social medicine, or in research institutes devoted to these aspects of medicine, throughout the world". This was to be achieved by the publication of a Bulletin twice a year and by members endeavouring to "ensure a friendly and hospitable welcome for visitors" from other countries. The first issue of the Bulletin appeared in January 1955 and contained contributions from 26 correspondents from nine countries.

Correspondents soon felt the need to meet to discuss research and teaching and the first formal meeting took place at the Ciba Foundation in London at the end of June 1956. By this time there were 49 correspondents from 18 countries, and one of them, A. Querido of Amsterdam invited the Club to hold its First International Scientific Meeting in the Netherlands. As a consequence a Study Group on Current Epidemiological Research, supported by a grant from the Rockefeller Foundation, took place at Noordwijk in September 1957. There were 58 participants representing 44 university departments from 20 countries at this meeting. A constitution was formulated and the first executive committee was elected. The Noordwijk meeting was the first of the nineteenth international scientific meetings which have been held to date. The second was held in the Universidad del Valle in Cali, Colombia, in 1959 when the present title of the association was adopted.

== The World Congress of Epidemiology (WCE) ==
With few exceptions, the scientific meetings of the association have been held every three years since 1957 in different locations around the world. At the first Council Meeting held in Montreal 17–18 August 2002, it was agreed that all meetings formerly entitled International Scientific Meeting would henceforth be called World Congress of Epidemiology (WCE), with a continued sequence of numbering. Here is a list of the WCE held since 1957:

- I Noordwijk, Netherlands, September 1957
- II Cali, Colombia, August 1959
- III Korčula, Yugoslavia, August 1961
- IV Princeton, US, August 1964
- V Primosten, Yugoslavia, August 1968
- VI Primosten, Yugoslavia, August 1971
- VII Brighton, England, August 1974
- VIII San Juan, Puerto Rico, September 1977
- IX Edinburgh, Scotland, August 1981
- X Vancouver, Canada, August 1984
- XI Helsinki, Finland, August 1987
- XII Los Angeles, US, August 1990
- XIII Sydney, Australia, September 1993
- XIV Nagoya, Japan, August 1996
- XV Florence, Italy, August 1999
- XVI Montreal, Canada, August 2002
- XVII Bangkok, Thailand, August 2005
- XVIII Porto Alegre, Brazil, September 2008
- XIX Edinburgh, Scotland, August 2011
- XX Anchorage, US, August 2014
- XXI Saitama, Japan, August 2017
- XXII Melbourne, Australia, September 2021 [online]
- XXIII Cape Town, South Africa, September 2024

== Educational work ==
The IEA has always attached great importance to the educational aspects of its work and its first Chairman, Robert Cruikshank, often used the phrase "spreading the gospel" to describe these aims.

The meeting in Cali in 1959 stimulated great interest in epidemiology in Colombia and as a result three seminars on epidemiology were later organized by the IEA in that country. This marked the beginning of a series of seminars in the South American continent and the Caribbean area.

The Milbank Memorial Fund helped to make this extensive series of seminars possible and the WHO, through the Pan American Health Organization, also cooperated in these seminars. By 1977 the IEA had organized, or played a prominent part in, 23 Seminars or Workshops on epidemiology in 19 different countries. These were often conducted in association with the WHO. The association only undertakes to organize or participate in seminars at the invitation of the national or local educational or governmental bodies concerned.

In 1969 a decision was taken to produce a guide on the teaching of epidemiology which would be suitable for use throughout the world. The WHO agreed to cooperate in this project and Dr Ronald Lowe and Jan Kostrzewski were asked to edit the guide. It was published first in English as Epidemiology: A guide to Teaching Methods Teaching Epidemiology: A guide for teachers in epidemiology, public health and clinical medicine and also published in French, German, Polish, Serbo-Croat Slovak, and Spanish editions; and editions in Russian and Slovakare in preparation.

Other of the classic texts sponsored by the IEA in collaboration with Oxford University Press is A Dictionary of Epidemiology Oxford University Press: A Dictionary of Epidemiology: Miquel Porta which remains the definitive dictionary in epidemiology worldwide. In fact, with contributions from over 220 epidemiologists and other users of epidemiology from around the globe, it is more than a dictionary: it includes explanations and comments on both core epidemiologic terms and on other scientific terms relevant to all professionals in clinical medicine and public health, as well as to professionals in the other health, life, and social sciences. The aim of the IEA in cosponsoring this dictionary in its more than 20-year history has been to facilitate communication among epidemiologist to develop a "common language" to the extent that this is possible. The first fourth editions of the dictionary were edited by John Last, while the fifth, sixth, and seventh editions were edited by Miquel Porta. The seventh edition will be published in April, 2026. In addition, the IEA has produced a publication to commemorate its 50th anniversary called "History of Modern Epidemiology" in addition to supporting three editions of the publication Teaching Epidemiology Teaching Epidemiology: A guide for teachers in epidemiology, public health and clinical medicine. The IEA offers a free copy of one of the first two publications as an incentive for life-time (10-years) or 3-year membership.

The IEA also comments on current topical issues in epidemiology through a series of online "rapid response" commentaries EpiBlog « IEA.

== The International Journal of Epidemiology (IJE) ==
A decision was taken at the Sixth International Meeting in 1971 to found an international quarterly journal of epidemiology. The council believed that the journal could replace the old Bulletin in providing a link between members in intervals between international meetings by publishing association news, and serve a valuable purpose by publishing original articles in the field of epidemiology. Walter W. Holland was appointed the first editor in 1972. Between 2001 and 2016 under the editorship of George Davey Smith and Shah Ebrahim, the journal expanded. They introduced a number of new features and the positive effects of these changes are reflected in its improved impact factor (7.2 in 2015), which places it first among the international epidemiology journals. Six issues of the journal are published every year. Stephen Leeder took over as editor in 2017.

== Affiliations with international organizations ==
The association has a long tradition of collaboration with other organizations, particularly with the WHO and the Council for International Organizations of Medical Sciences (CIOMS) and International Clinical Epidemiologic Network (INCLEN) Inclen.

The IEA became affiliated with the CIOMS in 1955 and was represented on its executive committee. This affiliation led the association to the participation in preparing the international ethical guidelines for epidemiological studies, recognized by WHO as a key reference.

In 1966 the association was recognized by the WHO as a Non-Governmental Organization. In addition to representation at the World Health Assembly and regional committees, this affiliation contributed to excellent working relationships with WHO in the planning and execution of educational programmes of the IEA and in the production of the "Guide to Teaching Epidemiology".

The IEA is also an active member of the Countdown initiative, and provides oversight on data quality, analyses and interpretation. The Countdown to 2015: Maternal, Newborn and Child Health is a global initiative that includes academics and representatives of multilateral and bilateral agencies, professional organizations and civil society who share the common goal of increasing accountability for progress towards the Millennium Development Goals for improving the health of mothers and children.

== Membership ==
In the earlier years of the IEA, British and North American members were in the majority, mainly because the association had its origins in the UK and US. The council of the association has always been very conscious of this tendency and made active efforts to broaden the representativeness of the association by encouraging members to nominate epidemiologists from other countries. Nowadays, membership is growing in the association, with over 2,000 current members from around the world. Current membership categories include:

1. Ordinary members (fully paid up members)
2. Senior members (eligible for 50% discount of annual membership)
3. Student members (eligible for 50% discount of annual membership)
4. Joint members (with national epidemiological associations)
5. Sponsored members
6. Honorary members

The IEA has recently introduced a scheme of joint membership with various national epidemiological societies. Members of participating national societies join IEA at 30% of the usual rate and have all of the benefits of regular IEA membership, except that they receive the e-version of the IJE only. Joint membership have established with the following associations:

	Name of association
	Africa
1	Epidemiological Society of Nigeria (EPiSON)
	Eastern Mediterranean
2	Saudi Epidemiological Association (SEA)
3	Lebanese Epidemiological Association (LEA)
4	Iranian Epidemiological Association (IrEA)
	Europe
5	Finnish Epidemiological Society (FES)
6	German Society for Epidemiology (DGEpi)
7	Spanish Society of Epidemiology (SSE)
8	Netherlands Epidemiological Society (VvE)
	Latin America & Caribbean
10	The Brazilian Association of Post-Graduation in Collective Health (ABRASCO)
	North America
11	Society for Epidemiologic Research (SER)
	South East Asia
12	Indian Association of Preventive and Social Medicine (IAPSM)
13	Indian Society for Medical Statistics (ISMS)
14	Indian Public Health Association (IPHA)
	Western Pacific
15	Australasian Epidemiological Association (AEA)
16	Japan Epidemiological Association (JEA)

== Regional activities ==
The development and strengthening of regional activities is manifested by the record of the regional meetings. These have been stimulating affairs as shown by the publications which resulted. There have been regular meetings in most IEA Regions, including: Africa, South-East Asia, Eastern Mediterranean, Europe, Latin America and Caribbean, North America and Western Pacific and occasional ones in the remainder. Of particular note have been those which marked the foundation and strength of national epidemiological associations as in Japan, China and Holland. The growth and interest in epidemiology and the enormous improvement in the quality, as well as the quantity of epidemiological research has been particularly notable in some IEA regions as South East Asia. For example, the Australian Regional IEA meeting in 1973 was attended by nine Japanese - at that time the only such practicing scientists in that country. There was, by 1995, a flourishing national association with more than 900 members and its own Journal published in English. It was the host for the 1996 International Scientific Meeting (ISM). The number of participants, at Regional Meetings in this area e.g. from China, Indonesia, Malaysia, Philippines, Singapore and Thailand illustrate the increasing penetration of Epidemiology discipline.

The growth and strengthening of Epidemiology discipline outside Western Europe and North America has also led to increase in bids to act as hosts for ISMs, now known as WCEs.

== International training ==
In effort of enforcing the capacity building role of IEA and moving the 20-year-old Florence course to the south, IEA has started an annual short-course in epidemiological methods. Indeed, the course is allied to the IEA-sponsored European Educational Programme in Epidemiology Programmes EEPE, annually held in Florence for three weeks every June/July, under the directorship of Rodolfo Saracci, for more than 2 decades. Thus, such course is intended as a "Florence South" course, run annually on a five-year cycle of the IEA regions outside of Europe and North America (South East Asia, Eastern Mediterranean, Africa, Latin America and Western Pacific). Introductory, intermediate and advance level courses are offered to provide epidemiologists and public health professionals an opportunity to become acquainted with the advances in epidemiologic methods that can enhance the role of epidemiology in clinical medicine and public health. These courses are addressed to epidemiologists, public health professionals, statisticians, and clinicians and include lectures, computer based analyses, exercises, discussion sessions, and practical experience in the design of a research proposal. The first course was held in Jaipur, India, in April 2009, the second in Riyadh, Saudi Arabia, in April, 2010, the third in Malawi in April 2011, while the latest was held in Lima, Peru, during May 2012. It is planned to have the upcoming course in Hangzhou, China, 2013.

The IEA also sponsors pre-conference courses prior to the WCE.

== Sir Richard Doll Prize ==
In commemoration of Sir Richard Doll, IEA established in 2007 the "Richard Doll Prize in Epidemiology" to be awarded on triennial basis. The prize is awarded to an epidemiologist of the highest scientific standard. The recipient is honored for his/her scientific achievements that have advanced our understanding of the determinants of a disease of importance for health in populations through a body of research that may involve a series of studies, rather than a single publication. The prize winner is selected by a committee which includes current IEA president, president-elect, past-president in addition to two members appointed by the IEA Council. The prize is presented at the triennial WCE as $30,000 and a special plaque. The first prize has been conferred in 2008 to Prof Nubia Muñoz, while the second was awarded to Prof David Barker in 2011. Subsequent winners included Sir Richard Peto in 2014 George Davey Smith in 2017 and Cesar Victora in 2021.

== Early Career Epidemiologists (ECE) ==
The IEA Executive Committee recently decided to create an International (worldwide) Early Career Epidemiologists group (ECE) within the IEA structure. A successful first meeting of ECE was held during the XIX IEA World Congress of Epidemiology (WCE) in Edinburgh (Scotland). The aims of this group are similar to those of the IEA, with a focus on identifying tools and opportunities to develop knowledge and careers for emerging professionals engaged in the field of epidemiology throughout the world. The IEA has decided to invest effort and resources in ensuring the connectivity among ECE and thus facilitate the promulgation of opportunities for IEA training events, a mentoring scheme, and other activities which promote the advance and appropriate use of the epidemiological methods and its development in all regions.

== The future ==
The educational work of the IEA has always been regarded as one of its most important functions. This will continue through the media of the International Journal of Epidemiology and the International and Regional Scientific meetings. It is hoped that the IEA will be able to continue to play a part in the organization of seminars particularly in those parts of the world where epidemiology is not well developed. Owing to the lack of funds for this purpose such activities may have to be confined, for the present, to co-operation with national or international organizations, in particular the WHO, by providing faculty members and resource material rather than funds.

There was general support for continued regional development at the Seventh International Meeting and the first steps were taken towards the organization of further regional meetings. The previous council recommended that regional IEA councils covering the WHO regions should be established in order to stimulate recruitment of members and the organization of international meetings within regions. The present council consists of members from all the WHO regions and it is now considering the whole question of regional development.

== See also ==
- Environmental epidemiology
- Epidemiology
- E-epidemiology
- Epidemic model
- Epidemiological methods
- Epidemiological transition
