= Preregistration (science) =

Scientific practice

Preregistration is the practice of registering the hypotheses, methods, or analyses of a scientific study before it is conducted. Clinical trial registration is similar, although it may not require the registration of a study's analysis protocol. Finally, registered reports include the peer review and in principle acceptance of a study protocol prior to data collection.

Preregistration has the goal to transparently evaluate the severity of hypothesis tests, and can have a number of secondary goals (which can also be achieved without preregistering), including (a) facilitating and documenting research plans, (b) identifying and reducing questionable research practices and researcher biases, (c) distinguishing between confirmatory and exploratory analyses, and, in the case of registered reports, (d) facilitating results-blind peer review, and (e) reducing publication bias.

Although the idea of preregistration is old, the practice of preregistering studies has gained prominence to mitigate certain issues that contribute to the replication crisis in scientific studies. Among others, these issues include publication bias and questionable research practices, such as p-hacking and HARKing.

== Types ==
=== Standard preregistration ===
In the standard preregistration format, researchers prepare a research protocol document prior to conducting their research. Ideally, this document indicates the research hypotheses, sampling procedure, sample size, research design, testing conditions, stimuli, measures, data coding and aggregation method, criteria for data exclusions, and statistical analyses, including potential variations on those analyses. This preregistration document is then posted on a publicly available website such as the Open Science Framework or AsPredicted. The preregistered study is then conducted, and a report of the study and its results are submitted for publication together with access to the preregistration document. This preregistration approach allows peer reviewers and subsequent readers to cross-reference the preregistration document with the published research article in order to identify the presence of any opportunistic deviations of the preregistration that reduce the severity of tests. Deviations from the preregistration are possible and common in practice, but they should be transparently reported, and the consequences for the severity of the test should be evaluated.

=== Registered reports ===
The registered report format requires authors to submit a description of the study methods and analyses prior to data collection. Once the theoretical introduction, method, and analysis plan has been peer reviewed (Stage 1 peer review), publication of the findings is provisionally guaranteed (in principle acceptance). The proposed study is then performed, and the research report is submitted for Stage 2 peer review. Stage 2 peer review confirms that the actual research methods are consistent with the preregistered protocol, that quality thresholds are met (e.g., manipulation checks confirm the validity of the experimental manipulation), and that the conclusions follow from the data. Because studies are accepted for publication regardless of whether the results are statistically significant, registered reports prevent publication bias. Meta-scientific research has shown that the percentage of non-significant results in registered reports is substantially higher than in standard publications.

=== Specialized preregistration ===
Preregistration can be used in relation to a variety of different research designs and methods, including:

- Adaptive preregistration
- Quantitative research in psychology
- Qualitative research
- Preexisting data
- Single case designs
- Electroencephalogram research
- Experience sampling
- Exploratory research
- Animal Research

== Clinical trial registration ==
Clinical trial registration is the practice of documenting clinical trials before they are performed in a clinical trials registry so as to combat publication bias and selective reporting. Registration of clinical trials is required in some countries and is increasingly being standardized. Some top medical journals will only publish the results of trials that have been pre-registered.

A clinical trials registry is a platform which catalogs registered clinical trials. ClinicalTrials.gov, run by the United States National Library of Medicine (NLM) was the first online registry for clinical trials, and remains the largest and most widely used. In addition to combating bias, clinical trial registries serve to increase transparency and access to clinical trials for the public. Clinical trials registries are often searchable (e.g. by disease/indication, drug, location, etc.). Trials are registered by the pharmaceutical, biotech or medical device company (Sponsor) or by the hospital or foundation which is sponsoring the study, or by another organization, such as a contract research organization (CRO) which is running the study.

There has been a push from governments and international organizations, especially since 2005, to make clinical trial information more widely available and to standardize registries and processes of registering. The World Health Organization is working toward "achieving consensus on both the minimal and the optimal operating standards for trial registration".

=== Creation and development ===
For many years, scientists and others have worried about reporting biases such that negative or null results from initiated clinical trials may be less likely to be published than positive results, thus skewing the literature and our understanding of how well interventions work. This worry has been international and written about for over 50 years. One of the proposals to address this potential bias was a comprehensive register of initiated clinical trials that would inform the public which trials had been started. Ethical issues were those that seemed to interest the public most, as trialists (including those with potential commercial gain) benefited from those who enrolled in trials, but were not required to "give back," telling the public what they had learned.

Those who were particularly concerned by the double standard were systematic reviewers, those who summarize what is known from clinical trials. If the literature is skewed, then the results of a systematic review are also likely to be skewed, possibly favoring the test intervention when in fact the accumulated data do not show this, if all data were made public.

ClinicalTrials.gov was originally developed largely as a result of breast cancer consumer lobbying, which led to authorizing language in the FDA Modernization Act of 1997 (Food and Drug Administration Modernization Act of 1997. Pub L No. 105-115, §113 Stat 2296), but the law provided neither funding nor a mechanism of enforcement. In addition, the law required that ClinicalTrials.gov only include trials of serious and life-threatening diseases.

Then, two events occurred in 2004 that increased public awareness of the problems of reporting bias. First, the then-New York State Attorney General Eliot Spitzer sued GlaxoSmithKline (GSK) because they had failed to reveal results from trials showing that certain antidepressants might be harmful.

Shortly thereafter, the International Committee of Medical Journal Editors (ICMJE) announced that their journals would not publish reports of trials unless they had been registered. The ICMJE action was probably the most important motivator for trial registration, as investigators wanted to reserve the possibility that they could publish their results in prestigious journals, should they want to.

In 2007, the Food and Drug Administration Amendments Act of 2007 (FDAAA) clarified the requirements for registration and also set penalties for non-compliance (Public Law 110-85. The Food and Drug Administration Amendments Act of 2007 .

=== International participation ===
The International Committee of Medical Journal Editors (ICMJE) decided that from July 1, 2005 no trials will be considered for publication unless they are included on a clinical trials registry. The World Health Organization has begun the push for clinical trial registration with the initiation of the International Clinical Trials Registry Platform. There has also been action from the pharmaceutical industry, which released plans to make clinical trial data more transparent and publicly available. Released in October 2008, the revised Declaration of Helsinki, states that "Every clinical trial must be registered in a publicly accessible database before recruitment of the first subject."

The World Health Organization maintains an international registry portal called the International Clinical Trials Registry Platform intended "to ensure that a complete view of research is accessible to all those involved in health care decision making."

Since 2007, the International Committee of Medical Journal Editors ICMJE accepts all primary registries in the WHO network in addition to clinicaltrials.gov. Clinical trial registration in other registries excluding ClinicalTrials.gov has increased irrespective of study designs since 2014.

=== Reporting compliance ===
Various studies have measured the extent to which various trials are in compliance with the reporting standards of their registry.

=== Overview of clinical trial registries ===
Worldwide, there is growing number of registries. A 2013 study identified the following top five registries (numbers updated as of August 2013):

1.	ClinicalTrials.gov	150,551
2.	EU register	21,060
3.	Japan registries network (JPRN)	12,728
4.	ISRCTN	11,794
5.	Australia and New Zealand (ANZCTR)	8,216

=== Overview of preclinical study registries ===
Similar to clinical research, preregistration can help to improve transparency and quality of research data in preclinical research. In contrast to clinical research where preregistration is mandatory for vast parts it is still new in preclinical research. A large part of preclinical and basic biomedical research relies on animal experiments. The non-publication of results gained from animal experiments not only distorts the state of research by reinforcing the publication bias, it further represents an ethical issue. Preregistration is discussed as a measure that could counteract this problem. Following registries are suited for the preregistration of preclinical studies.

1.	Animalstudyregistry.org
2.	AsPredicted
3.	OSF Registry
4.	Preclinicaltrials.eu

== Journal support ==
Over 200 journals offer a registered reports option (Centre for Open Science, 2019), and the number of journals that are adopting registered reports is approximately doubling each year (Chambers et al., 2019).

Psychological Science has encouraged the preregistration of studies and the reporting of effect sizes and confidence intervals. The editor-in-chief also noted that the editorial staff will be asking for replication of studies with surprising findings from examinations using small sample sizes before allowing the manuscripts to be published.

Nature Human Behaviour has adopted the registered report format, as it "shift[s] the emphasis from the results of research to the questions that guide the research and the methods used to answer them".

European Journal of Personality defines this format: "In a registered report, authors create a study proposal that includes theoretical and empirical background, research questions/hypotheses, and pilot data (if available). Upon submission, this proposal will then be reviewed prior to data collection, and if accepted, the paper resulting from this peer-reviewed procedure will be published, regardless of the study outcomes."

Note that only a very small proportion of academic journals in psychology and neurosciences explicitly stated that they welcome submissions of replication studies in their aim and scope or instructions to authors. This phenomenon does not encourage the reporting or even attempt on replication studies.

Overall, the number of participating journals is increasing, as indicated by the Center for Open Science, which maintains a list of journals encouraging the submission of registered reports.

== Benefits ==
Several articles have outlined the rationale for preregistration (e.g., Lakens, 2019; Nosek et al., 2018; Wagenmakers et al., 2012). The primary goal of preregistration is to improve the transparency of reported hypothesis tests, which allows readers to evaluate the extent to which decisions during the data analysis were pre-planned (maintaining statistical error control) or data-driven (increasing the Type 1 or Type 2 error rate).

Meta-scientific research has revealed additional benefits. Researchers indicate preregistering a study leads to a more carefully thought through research hypothesis, experimental design, and statistical analysis. In addition, preregistration has been shown to encourage better learning of Open Science concepts and students felt that they understood their dissertation and it improved the clarity of the manuscript writing, promoted rigour and were more likely to avoid questionable research practices. In addition, it becomes a tool that supervisors can use to shape students to combat any questionable research practices.

A 2024 study in the Journal of Political Economy: Microeconomics preregistration in economics journals found that preregistration reduced p-hacking and publication bias if the preregistration was accompanied by a preanalysis plan, but not if the preregistration did not specify the planned analyses.

== Criticisms ==
=== Analytical Flexibility ===
Proponents of preregistration have argued that it is "a method to increase the credibility of published results" (Nosek & Lakens, 2014), that it "makes your science better by increasing the credibility of your results" (Centre for Open Science), and that it "improves the interpretability and credibility of research findings" (Nosek et al., 2018, p. 2605). This argument assumes that on average non-preregistered analyses are less "credible" and/or "interpretable" than preregistered analyses because researchers may opportunistically abuse flexibility in the data analysis to reduce the severity of the tests. However, critics have argued that preregistration is not necessary to take analytical flexibility into consideration: Some hypotheses allow more analytical flexibility than others (e.g., Auspurg & Brüderl, 2021), and researchers, reviewers, and readers can take these differences into account when evaluating research conclusions (Hitchcock & Sober, 2004, p. 7; Lakatos, 1968, pp. 375-376; Lash & Vandenbroucke, 2012, pp. 185-186; Szollosi & Donkin, 2021, pp. 2-3; Rubin, 2020, p. 378; Rubin & Donkin, 2024, p. 2035). As Popper explained, theories that allow a wider "range" of predictions in a study should be downgraded as being less "severely testable" (Popper, 2002, pp. 95, 108). Importantly, this Popperian assessment of testability can be made in the absence of preregistration (Rubin, 2025).

It is also worth noting that researchers face a range of practical constraints that limit their ability to opportunistically abuse analytical flexibility. Specifically, they are constrained by analytical norms and conventions as well as the requirement to produce multiple, theoretically interesting, directionally consistent results that survive robustness checks and use conceptually consistent methods and analytical approaches across multiple studies in their research articles (Murayama et al., 2014, pp. 108-109; Wegener et al., 2024). However, this criticism itself has been criticized as "Authors who have raised this criticism on preregistration fail to provide any real-life examples of theories that sufficiently constrain how they can be tested, nor do they provide empirical support for their hypothesis that peers can identify systematic bias".

=== Circular Reasoning ===
Nosek et al. (2018) argued that preregistration is important because it provides a clear distinction between predictions and postdictions (post hoc explanations). Failing to make this distinction can lead to the fallacy of "circular reasoning––generating a hypothesis based on observing data, and then evaluating the validity of the hypothesis based on the same data" (Nosek et al., 2018, p. 2600). However, critics have argued that preregistration is not necessary to identify circular reasoning (Rubin & Donkin, 2024, p. 2025). Circular reasoning can be identified by analysing the logic of the reasoning per se without needing to knowing the timing of that reasoning (Popper, 1962, p. 288; Popper, 1983, p. 133; Popper, 2002, p. 274; for examples, see Kriegeskorte et al., 2009, p. 536).

=== Deterring Exploratory Analyses ===
Critics have noted that the idea that preregistration improves research credibility may deter researchers from undertaking non-preregistered exploratory analyses (Coffman & Niederle, 2015; see also Collins et al., 2021, Study 1). In response, preregistration advocates have stressed that a) exploratory analyses were rarely published to begin with, and b) that exploratory analyses are permitted in preregistered studies, and that the results of these analyses retain some value vis-a-vis hypothesis generation rather than hypothesis testing. Preregistration merely makes the distinction between confirmatory and exploratory research clearer (Nosek et al., 2018; Nosek & Lakens, 2014; Wagenmakers et al., 2012). Hence, although preregistration is supposed to reduce researcher degrees of freedom during the data analysis stage, it is also supposed to be "a plan, not a prison" (Dehaven, 2017). Deviations are sometimes improvements, and should be transparently reported so that others can evaluate the consequences of the deviation. However, critics have argued that treating preregistration as a plan, rather than a prison, blurs the distinction between confirmatory and exploratory research "because adjustable plans do not control the Type I error rate" (Rubin, 2025, p. 19; see also Navarro, 2020, p. 8), and research becomes "exploratory" when error rates are not controlled (Ditroilo et al., 2024, p. 1109).

=== The Distinction Between Confirmatory and Exploratory Research ===
Critics have also argued that the distinction between confirmatory and exploratory analyses is unclear and/or irrelevant (Devezer et al., 2020; Rubin, 2020; Szollosi & Donkin, 2019),. However, more recent work has provided a more principled definition of 'exploratory' and 'confirmatory' by arguing that "hypothesis tests are confirmatory when their error rates are controlled, and exploratory when the error rates are not controlled." which both clarifies the distinction, and demonstrates the relevance of the distinction for preregistration. As discussed above, however, this definition implies that research should be regarded as "exploratory" when preregistration is treated as "a plan, not a prison," because adjustable plans do not control error rates (Navarro, 2020, p. 8; Rubin, 2025).

=== Practical Implementation ===
There are also concerns about the practical implementation of preregistration. Many preregistered protocols leave plenty of room for p-hacking (Bakker et al., 2020; Heirene et al., 2021; Ikeda et al., 2019; Singh et al., 2021; Van den Akker et al., 2023), and researchers rarely follow the exact research methods and analyses that they preregister (Abrams et al., 2020; Claesen et al., 2019; Heirene et al., 2021; Clayson et al., 2025; see also Boghdadly et al., 2018; Singh et al., 2021; Sun et al., 2019). In terms of credibility, pre-registered studies are only of higher quality than non-pre-registered studies if the former has a power analysis and higher sample size than the latter but other than that they do not seem to prevent p-hacking and HARKing, as both the proportion of positive results and effect sizes are similar between preregistered and non-preregistered studies (Van den Akker et al., 2023). In terms of adherence, a study of 92 EEG/ERP studies showed that only 60% of studies adhered to their preregistrations or disclosed all deviations. Notably, registered reports had the higher adherence rates (92%) than unreviewed preregistrations (60%). In general, around three-quarters of preregistered studies included at least one deviation (Rubin, 2025, p. 19). Hence, in many cases, what were intended as preregistered confirmatory tests end up as unplanned exploratory tests.

Again, preregistration advocates argue that deviations from preregistered plans are acceptable as long as they are reported transparently and justified. They also point out that even vague preregistrations help to reduce researcher degrees of freedom and make any residual flexibility transparent (Simmons et al., 2021, p. 180). However, critics argue that it is not useful to identify or justify deviations from preregistered plans when those plans do not reflect high quality theory and research practice. As Rubin (2020) explained, "we should be more interested in the rationale for the current method and analyses than in the rationale for historical changes that have led up to the current method and analyses" (pp. 378–379).

In addition, pre-registering a study requires careful deliberation about the study's hypotheses, research design and statistical analyses. This depends on the use of pre-registration templates that provides detailed guidance on what to include and why (Bowman et al., 2016; Haven & Van Grootel, 2019; Van den Akker et al., 2021). Many pre-registration template stress the importance of a power analysis but not only stress the importance of why the methodology was used.

Finally, there are concerns about the additional workload involved in preregistering studies. It takes time for researchers to prepare preregistrations (Hostler, 2023), and it takes time for reviewers to cross-reference preregistrations with final research reports to identify any unreported deviations. Indeed, there is evidence that editors and reviewers do not check preregistrations during the review process (Syed, 2025).

=== Qualitative Research ===
Critics have also argued that preregistration is less applicable, or even unsuitable, for qualitative research. Pre-registration imposes rigidity, limiting researchers' ability to adapt to emerging data and evolving contexts, which are essential to capturing the richness of participants' lived experiences (Souza-Neto & Moyle, 2025). Additionally, it conflicts with the inductive and flexible nature of theory-building in qualitative research, constraining the exploratory approach that is central to this methodology (Souza-Neto & Moyle, 2025).

=== Detrimental Effects ===
Some commentators have argued that, under some circumstances, preregistration may actually harm science by providing a false sense of credibility to research studies and analyses (Devezer et al., 2020; McPhetres, 2020; Pham & Oh, 2020; Rubin & Donkin, 2024; Szollosi et al., 2020). Consistent with this view, there is some evidence that researchers view registered reports as being more credible than standard reports on a range of dimensions (Soderberg et al., 2020; see also Field et al., 2020 for inconclusive evidence), although it is unclear whether this represents a "false" sense of credibility due to pre-existing positive community attitudes about preregistration or a genuine causal effect of registered reports on quality of research.

== See also ==
- AllTrials
- Clinical trial registration
- Metascience
- Open science
