= Uri Simonsohn =

American behavioral scientist

Uri Simonsohn is a behavioral scientist at ESADE Business School in Ramon Llull University in Barcelona, Spain, and a Senior Fellow and co-director of the Wharton Credibility Lab at the Wharton School of the University of Pennsylvania. His substantive interest is in Judgment and Decision Making, and he is also a methodologist.

He is originally from Chile. He earned his undergraduate degree in economics from Universidad Católica de Chile, and his PhD at Carnegie Mellon University in Social and Decision Sciences in 2003, and became a professor of Operations Management at the Wharton School where he stayed until 2017, leaving to move to ESADE Business School in Barcelona as a full professor.

He has been involved in research on false-positives, p-hacking, experimental replication, and pre-registrations of research. He has contributed to identifying various cases of scientific fraud including the work of Dirk Smeesters, Lawrence Sanna, Dan Ariely and Francesca Gino.

He has also developed two R packages: groundhog, for version-control of R packages, and statuser, designed to simplify statistical output for applied researchers.

== Wharton Credibility Lab ==
Simonsohn co-directs the Wharton Credibility Lab at the University of Pennsylvania together with Leif Nelson and Joseph Simmons. The lab develops and maintains several platforms aimed at improving the transparency and credibility of scientific research:

- AsPredicted – a pre-registration platform for social science research, designed to be the simplest available tool for researchers to pre-register hypotheses before data collection.
- ResearchBox – a platform for sharing pre-registrations, data, code, and research materials in a transparent and permanently accessible way.
- AsCollected – a platform for archiving and sharing the materials used to collect data in research studies, such as survey instruments and experimental stimuli.
- p-curve.com – a web app implementing p-curve analysis, a statistical method developed by Simonsohn, Nelson, and Simmons to assess whether a set of studies contains genuine evidential value or reflects selective reporting.
- GRAN (Global R Archive Network) – a repository preserving all historical versions of R packages on CRAN, taken over by Simonsohn after Microsoft discontinued the service in 2023.
- groundhog – an R package for version-control of R packages, enabling reproducible research environments.
- statuser – an R package designed with the end-users of statistics in mind, simplifying the output of common statistical functions for applied researchers.

== Data Colada ==
Simonsohn is a co-founder and co-author of Data Colada, a blog launched in September 2013 together with Leif Nelson (University of California, Berkeley) and Joseph Simmons (University of Pennsylvania). The blog, subtitled "Thinking about evidence, and vice versa," focuses on statistical methodology, research credibility, and the detection of scientific misconduct. It has been described by The New York Times as "a hub for nerdy discussions of statistical methods — and, before long, various research crimes and misdemeanors."

Among the blog's most notable posts are investigations into suspected data falsification, including a series presenting evidence that papers by Dan Ariely contained fabricated data, and a four-part investigation into papers by Francesca Gino that led to Harvard placing Gino on administrative leave and a subsequent defamation lawsuit against the blog's authors. Simonsohn has also identified his five personal favorite posts from the blog, spanning topics in statistical methodology and research design, which are listed at urisohn.com/colada5.

== See also ==
- Data Colada
- Wharton Credibility Lab
- P-hacking
- Open science
