= Animal Study Registry =

Research study registry

Animal Study Registry is an online registry for the preregistration of research studies involving animals. Animal Study Registry was launched in January 2019 and can be used by scientists worldwide.

== History ==
The reproducibility of animal test results in biomedical research has been questioned repeatedly in the past. Discussions about this replication crisis have already reached the public. In clinical research, the call for transparency led to the introduction of clinical trial registries that disclose the experimental design of clinical trials before the study is conducted. In order to increase the transparency and the quality in the field of preclinical and basic research, the establishment of so-called centralized animal study registries was suggested. The German Federal Institute for Risk Assessment (BfR), as a scientifically independent research institution, has decided to provide an international freely accessible platform for the pre-registration of studies involving animal experiments.

== Goal ==
The causes for the replication crisis in biomedical research are being intensively discussed within the scientific community. The publication bias was identified as one main reason for the lack of reproducibility of research results. This means, only significant and novel results are published while null results are never revealed, which leads to a distorted view of the state of research. Furthermore, poor study design, poor statistical planning and incomplete method description were, among others, identified as further reasons for non-reproducibility.

The purpose of Animal Study Registry is to register animal experiments with detailed information on methods, working hypotheses and biometric planning prior to the start of the study. Registration of the study plan could reduce the publication bias and prevent practices like data dredging. Indeed, Scientists would have to justify in the future why they differed from the original project planning or why some results were not published. The detailed query of the methods as well as the statistical planning supports the scientists in the study preparation and can thus increase the quality of as well as the reproducibility of the animal experiments. Results from animal experiments that are not published or whose informative value is impaired due to poor study quality can lead to animal experiments being unnecessarily repeated.
