= Juliana Schroeder =

US scientist and academic

Academic background
- Education: University of Virginia (BA) University of Chicago Booth School of Business (MBA) University of Chicago (MA, PhD)

Academic work
- Discipline: Behavioral scientist
- Institutions: University of California, Berkeley Haas School of Business
- Website: julianaschroeder.com

Juliana Schroeder is an American behavioral scientist and academic. She is a professor at Haas School of Business, University of California, Berkeley.

== Education ==
Schroeder's educational background includes a B.A. in psychology and economics from the University of Virginia, an M.B.A. from the University of Chicago Booth School of Business, and an M.A. and Ph.D. in Psychology and Business from the University of Chicago.

== Career ==
Schroeder teaches at the Haas School of Business. She is the director of the Experimental Social Science Laboratory (Xlab) at UC Berkeley, as well as a faculty affiliate in the Department of Social and Personality Psychology, Department of Cognition, and the Center for Human-Compatible AI at UC Berkeley.

Schroeder also occupies a number of academic roles outside of Haas. Schroeder is the cofounder and director of the Psychology of Technology Institute, which supports and advances scientific research regarding the psychological consequences and antecedents of technological advancements.

Meanwhile, she is an elected member of the Society for Personality and Social Psychology, Association for Psychological Science, Society for Judgment and Decision Making, Academy of Management, International Association of Conflict Management, Association for Consumer Research. Schroeder also serves as an ad-hoc reviewer of peer-reviewed journals such as Organizational Behavior and Human Decision Processes, Group Processes and Intergroup Relations, and Academy of Management.

Schroeder's research examines how people make social judgments and decisions. She studies the psychological processes underlying how people think about the minds of those around them, and how their judgments then influence their decisions and interactions.

== Efforts to Address Research Misconduct ==
After Francesca Gino was placed on leave from Harvard amid allegations of research fraud, Schroeder and several other scientists co-founded the "Many Co-Authors" project which sought to identify the data provenance of Gino's studies. Schroeder worked with colleagues to audit her 7 empirical papers co-authored with Gino, and posted the completed audits on each paper's Many Co-Authors page. After the audits were complete, she reported that a paper she had coauthored with Francesca Gino was compromised.

Nick Brown, a scientific-integrity researcher affiliated with Linnaeus University in Sweden, said he is "100 percent" certain that the data in one of the studies of the paper, Study 1b, were tampered with: "In my view, there is no innocent explanation in a universe where fairies don't exist." Schroeder did not view or handle the data from Study 1b. Schroeder led co-authors in requesting retraction of the paper from the journal.

A second article Schroeder coauthored with Gino also had data irregularities. This paper was also retracted at the request of the authors, but the paper has now been corrected with the audited results. Regarding this paper, Schroeder said: "I couldn't feel worse about that paper and that study...I'm deeply ashamed of it."

Schroeder co-authored five other papers with Gino that were audited and not found to have significant issues.

== Awards and honors ==
- Association for Psychological Science Fellow, 2026
- Society for Experimental Social Psychology Fellow, 2021
- Early Career Award, International Association of Conflict Management, 2019
- The International Social Cognition Network Early Career Award, 2018
- Association for Psychological Science Rising Star, 2017
