= Leakage (machine learning) =

Concept in machine learning

In statistics and machine learning, leakage (also known as data leakage or target leakage) refers to the use of information during model training that would not be available at prediction time. This results in overly optimistic performance estimates, as the model appears to perform better during evaluation than it actually would in a production environment.

Leakage is often subtle and indirect, making it difficult to detect and eliminate. It can lead a statistician or modeler to select a suboptimal model, which may be outperformed by a leakage-free alternative.

== Leakage modes ==
Leakage can occur at multiple stages of the machine learning workflow. Broadly, its sources can be divided into two categories: those arising from features and those arising from training examples.

=== Feature leakage ===
Feature or column-wise leakage is caused by the inclusion of columns which are one of the following: a duplicate label, a proxy for the label, or the label itself. These features, known as anachronisms, will not be available when the model is used for predictions, and result in leakage if included when the model is trained.

For example, including a "MonthlySalary" column when predicting "YearlySalary"; or "MinutesLate" when predicting "IsLate".

=== Training example leakage ===
Row-wise leakage is caused by improper sharing of information between rows of data. Types of row-wise leakage include:

- Premature featurization; leaking from premature featurization before Cross-validation/Train/Test split (must fit min-max scaling/ngrams/etc on only the train split, then transform the test set)
- Duplicate rows between train/validation/test (for example, oversampling a dataset to pad its size before splitting; or, different rotations/augmentations of a single image; bootstrap sampling before splitting; or duplicating rows to up sample the minority class)
- Non-independent and identically distributed random (non-IID) data
  - Time leakage (for example, splitting a time-series dataset randomly instead of newer data in test set using a train/test split or rolling-origin cross-validation)
  - Group leakage—not including a grouping split column (for example, Andrew Ng's group had 100k x-rays of 30k patients, meaning ~3 images per patient. The paper used random splitting instead of ensuring that all images of a patient were in the same split. Hence the model partially memorized the patients instead of learning to recognize pneumonia in chest x-rays.)

A 2023 review found data leakage to be "a widespread failure mode in machine-learning (ML)-based science", having affected at least 294 academic publications across 17 disciplines, and causing a potential reproducibility crisis.

== Detection ==
Data leakage in machine learning can be detected through various methods, focusing on performance analysis, feature examination, data auditing, and model behavior analysis. Performance-wise, unusually high accuracy or significant discrepancies between training and test results often indicate leakage. Inconsistent cross-validation outcomes may also signal issues.

Feature examination involves scrutinizing feature importance rankings and ensuring temporal integrity in time series data. A thorough audit of the data pipeline is crucial, reviewing pre-processing steps, feature engineering, and data splitting processes. Detecting duplicate entries across dataset splits is also important.

For language models, the Min-K% method can detect the presence of data in a pretraining dataset. It presents a sentence suspected to be present in the pretraining dataset, and computes the log-likelihood of each token, then compute the average of the lowest K of these. If this exceeds a threshold, then the sentence is likely present. This method is improved by comparing against a baseline of the mean and variance.

Analyzing model behavior can reveal leakage. Models relying heavily on counter-intuitive features or showing unexpected prediction patterns warrant investigation. Performance degradation over time when tested on new data may suggest earlier inflated metrics due to leakage.

Advanced techniques include backward feature elimination, where suspicious features are temporarily removed to observe performance changes. Using a separate hold-out dataset for final validation before deployment is advisable.

== See also ==
- AutoML
- Concept drift (where the structure of the system being studied evolves over time, invalidating the model)
- Data dredging
- Overfitting
- Resampling (statistics)
- Supervised learning
- Training, validation, and test sets
