= Francesca Gino =

Italian-American behavioral scientist (born 1978)

- Born: 1978 (age 47–48)

Academic background
- Education: University of Trento; Sant'Anna School of Advanced Studies

Academic work
- Discipline: Organizational behavior
- Sub-discipline: Honesty and ethical behavior
- Institutions: Harvard University
- Website: francescagino.com

Francesca Gino (born 1978) is an Italian behavioral scientist who served as tenured Tandon Family Professor of Business Administration at Harvard Business School (HBS), focusing on "honesty and ethical behavior". After an investigation in 2023 concluded she had falsified research data, she was put on unpaid administrative leave, stripped of her title, and removed from her post as the head of the Unit of Negotiation, Organizations and Markets (NOM). After an 18 months evaluation process, Harvard revoked her tenure and fired her in May 2025.

== Early life and education ==
She was raised in Tione di Trento, Italy. She received a bachelor's degree from the University of Trento in Trento, Italy, in 2001, and then a master's degree and a doctorate from Sant'Anna School of Advanced Studies in Pisa, Italy, in 2004. During these studies, she came to Harvard Business School as a visiting fellow, and stayed on as a postdoctoral fellow after completing her doctorate (2004−06).

== Career ==
Gino taught at University of North Carolina at Chapel Hill (2008−10) and at Carnegie Mellon University (2006−08). She joined Harvard University's permanent faculty in 2010. Gino conducted research on rule-breaking, which she discussed in her 2018 book, Rebel Talent. She was also affiliated with Harvard Law School's Program on Negotiation, and with Harvard University's Mind, Brain, Behavior Initiative. Between December 2016 and 2019, she served as editor-in-chief of Organizational Behavior and Human Decision Processes. In 2020 she received a total compensation from Harvard of $1,049,532, making her the 5th-highest-paid individual at the school. Gino co-authored many peer-reviewed articles and was described by behavioral scientist Maurice Schweitzer at the Wharton School as a "leading scholar in the field" of behavioral science.

== Data fabrication accusation and investigation ==
In or before 2020, ESSEC Business School graduate student Zoé Ziani developed concerns about the validity of results from a highly publicized paper by Gino about personal networking. According to Ziani, her academic advisers warned her not to criticize Gino, and two members of her dissertation committee refused to approve her thesis unless she deleted criticism of Gino's paper from it. In spring 2021, Ziani replicated Gino's study, failing to obtain any of the effects Gino reported, and concluded "there was almost no way the paper’s effect size could have been naturally generated" (as summarized by The New Yorker).

Ziani and a collaborator subsequently alerted Data Colada, a team of three behavioral scientists known for investigating faulty research, who had been independently developing concerns about Gino's work since 2014. Later that year, the Data Colada team contacted Harvard University about anomalies in four papers by Gino. Harvard subsequently conducted its own internal investigation with the help of an outside firm, which discovered additional data alterations besides the cases raised by Data Colada.

An internal investigation resulted in a 1,200-page report that found Gino “committed research misconduct intentionally, knowingly, or recklessly" and recommended the university initiate steps leading to her termination. In June 2023, Harvard Business School placed her on unpaid administrative leave. As described by the dean of HBS, "[a]fter a comprehensive evaluation that took 18 months from start to completion, the investigation committee—comprising three senior HBS colleagues—determined that research misconduct had occurred." According to the report, Gino offered two explanations for the signs of data tampering: either that this was an honest mistake by her or her research assistants, or that "someone who had access to her computer, online data-storage account, and/or data files" tampered with her data out of malice, naming one of her coauthors in one of the since-retracted papers as the most likely suspect. Neither of the two explanations was accepted by Harvard's investigators, who wrote in the report that "Although we acknowledge that the theory of a malicious actor might be remotely possible, we do not find it plausible," adding that Gino’s "repeated and strenuous argument for a scenario of data falsification by bad actors across four different studies, an argument we find to be highly implausible, leads us to doubt the credibility of her written and oral statements to this committee more generally."

Around the same time as Harvard placed Gino on leave, Data Colada published four blog posts detailing evidence that the four papers (all of which had been retracted or set to be retracted at that point), and possibly others by Gino, "contain fake data". The four now-retracted papers at the heart of the allegations:

- Shu; Mazar; Gino; Ariely; Bazerman (2012). "Signing at the beginning makes ethics salient…". Proceedings of the National Academy of Sciences. 109 (38): 15197–15300. doi:10.1073/pnas.1209746109. PMC 3458378. PMID 22927408. (Retracted, see doi:10.1073/pnas.2115397118, PMID 34518237, Retraction Watch)
- Gino; Kouchaki; Galinsky (2015). "The Moral Virtue of Authenticity: How Inauthenticity Produces Feelings of Immorality and Impurity". Psychological Science. 26 (7): 983–996. doi:10.1177/0956797615575277. PMID 25963614. (Retracted, see doi:10.1177/09567976231187596, PMID 37409891)
- Gino; Wiltermuth (2014). "Evil Genius? How Dishonesty Can Lead to Greater Creativity". Psychological Science. 25 (4): 973–981. doi:10.1177/0956797614520714. PMID 24549296. (Retracted, see doi:10.1177/09567976231187595, PMID 37409890)
- Gino; Kouchaki; Casciaro (2020). "Why Connect? Moral Consequences of Networking with a Promotion or Prevention Focus". Journal of Personality and Social Psychology. 119 (6): 1221–1238. doi:10.1037/pspa0000226. PMID 32551743. (Retracted, see doi:10.1037/pspa0000351, PMID 37589685)

The first of these papers had already been retracted due to an unrelated data issue, also uncovered by Data Colada. The other three papers were retracted in response to Harvard's investigation.

=== Defamation lawsuit ===
Gino subsequently filed a defamation suit against Harvard, Harvard Business School Dean Srikant Datar, and the three data investigators of Data Colada for $25 million, alleging that they had conspired to damage her reputation with false accusations and that the penalties against her amounted to gender-based discrimination under Title IX. Gino denied having falsified data, and she accused Harvard and the Data Colada team of having "worked together to destroy my career and reputation despite admitting they have no evidence proving their allegations." The lawsuit raised concerns about chilling effects. A group of researchers, including open science proponent Simine Vazire, raised over $370,000 to help cover the legal fees of Data Colada.

On October 10, 2023, Harvard University and Dean Datar filed a motion to partially dismiss the lawsuit, "citing the need for the University to have autonomy in its academic decision-making". On November 8, 2023, the Data Colada defendants filed a motion to dismiss the claims against them, contending that Gino's lawsuit does not meet the pleading standards for a viable defamation action. As part of its motion to partially dismiss, Harvard submitted its internal 1200-page report as evidence. Initially it was kept under seal, but the university as well as The New Yorker and the Reporters Committee for Freedom of the Press filed motions to make it public, which were opposed by Francesca Gino's lawyers, who filed a motion to keep the report from the public. In March 2024, Judge Myong J. Joun ruled to unseal it (with some redactions) as a judicial record "to which there exists a presumptive right of public access." In the view of Vox journalist Kelsey Piper, the unsealed document "makes the allegations of Gino’s misconduct look more warranted than ever."

On September 11, 2024, the judge dismissed all of Gino's claims against the Data Colada defendants (defamation and other claims), and dismissed Gino's defamation and certain other claims (such as violation of privacy) against the Harvard University defendants, while allowing some breach of contract claims against Harvard to continue. Gino also claimed that Harvard discriminated against her on the basis of her gender. Harvard did not move for dismissal of that claim, so the litigation continued on that claim as well. In May 2025, Gino's tenure and employment at Harvard were terminated before the end of her two-year suspension in June 2025. The school declined to provide specific reasoning for their decision but did state that this kind of revocation of tenure is rare and had not occurred for decades.

On November 2, 2026, Judge Joun granted Harvard summary judgment on all eight of Gino’s remaining claims, ruling in Harvard's favor and preventing the claims from being taken to trial.

=== Harvard countersuit ===
In fall 2023, Gino began to publicly claim that Harvard's investigation was improperly conducted and ignored key files, and she published a spreadsheet file that she claimed exonerated herself in one of the cases. On August 18, 2025 Harvard counter-sued Gino, alleging that she sent the school a falsified dataset in an attempt to exonerate herself and make Harvard's investigation look bad. Harvard's countersuit argues that the file in question “was fabricated by Professor Gino and placed on her laptop” and that the University “suffered reputational damage and economic losses” as a result of Gino's allegedly false statements.

=== Many Co-Authors Project ===
Following the revelations by Harvard and Data Colada, the Many Co-Authors Project was launched by a group of Gino's co-authors, a "mass self-auditing effort" where over 140 collaborators of Francesca Gino are trying "to collect and share information on the provenance and availability of the data for all articles co-authored by Francesca Gino." It began publishing findings on November 6, 2023, listing 56 papers that had named Gino as having been involved in data collection, and reporting that for around 60% of these, all the co-authors who had responded reported not having access to the raw data. Behavioral scientist Juliana Schroeder of University of California Berkeley stated that she and other collaborators had initiated the retraction of another paper they had coauthored with Gino, citing a failure to track down data for four experiments in the paper and "unexplained issues" with two of its other datasets. Gino reacted by decrying the Many Co-Authors Project for what she alleged was unfairly singling her out for scrutiny, and by accusing one of the involved researchers of falsely claiming that she (Gino) had collected data for one of the papers.

== Allegations of plagiarism ==
In April 2024, it was reported that Gino was suspected of numerous instances of plagiarism in several of her works, including her books Rebel Talent and Sidetracked. The instances were from a variety of sources, including several undergraduate theses (none of which was supervised by Gino), research papers and chapters by other researchers, and newspaper and magazine articles, including those by Forbes and Reactor (at the time Tor.com).

== Personal life ==
Gino has resided in Cambridge, Massachusetts. She is married to Greg Burd, an engineer, has four children, and is said to be "motorcycle-obsessed".

== Books ==
- Sidetracked: Why our decisions get derailed, and how we can stick to the plan. Boston: Harvard Business Review Press. 2013. ISBN 9781422142691. OCLC 807028907.
- Rebel talent: Why it pays to break the rules at work and in life. New York: Del Rey Street Books. 2018. ISBN 9780062694638. OCLC 1031929377.

== See also ==
- Academic dishonesty
- Data manipulation
- Scientific misconduct
