= Marta Serra-Garcia =

Spanish-American behavioral and experimental economist

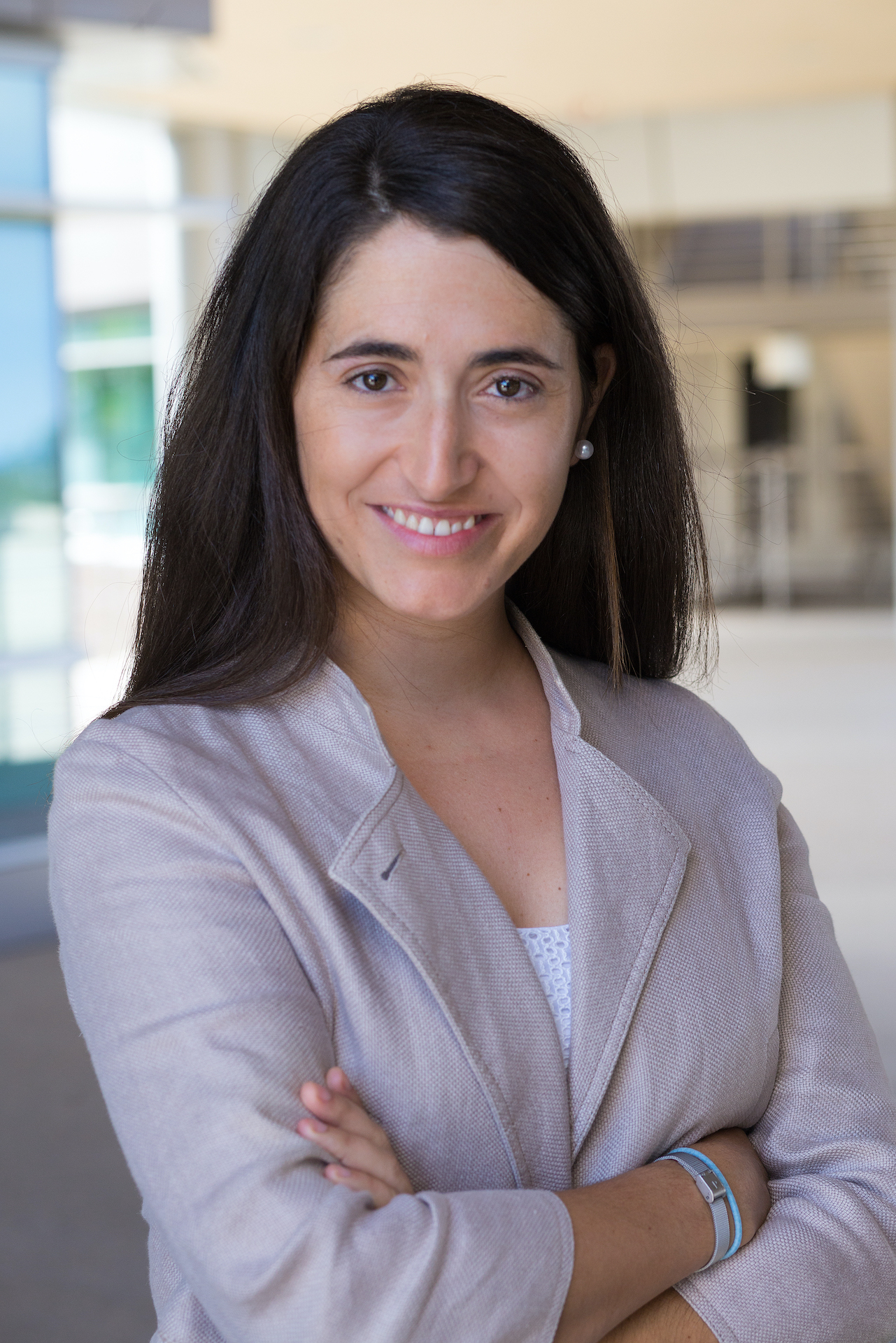

Academic background
- Education: Universitat Pompeu Fabra; Tilburg University

Academic work
- Discipline: Behavioral and experimental economics
- Institutions: UC San Diego Rady School of Management
- Website: https://rady.ucsd.edu/faculty-research/faculty/marta-serra-garcia.html

Marta Serra-Garcia is a Spanish behavioral and experimental economist. She is the Phyllis and Daniel Epstein Chancellor's Endowed Faculty Fellow and a Professor of Economics and Strategy at the Rady School of Management at the University of California, San Diego. Her research examines how information and incentives shape decision-making, honesty, and moral behavior, with applications to prosocial behavior and technology adoption. Serra-Garcia serves as Managing Editor of the Economic Journal. Serra-Garcia's research has been covered by major news outlets, including The Wall Street Journal, The Guardian, The Daily Dot, Ars Technica, and the Times of San Diego.

== Education ==
Serra-Garcia earned a Bachelor’s degree in Business Administration from Universitat Pompeu Fabra (Barcelona) in 2005, a Master of Philosophy (cum laude) in Economics from Tilburg University in 2007, and a Ph.D. in Economics from Tilburg University in 2011.

== Career ==
After completing her doctoral studies at Tilburg University in 2011, Serra-Garcia joined LMU Munich as an assistant professor, where she taught behavioral and experimental economics from 2011 to 2013. She moved to the Rady School of Management at the University of California, San Diego in 2013 as an assistant professor, was promoted to associate professor in 2021, and was promoted to professor in 2026.

Serra-Garcia has held visiting appointments and collaborations at several international research centers, including New York University and Universitat Pompeu Fabra. She is the managing editor of the Economic Journal. Previously, she served as associate editor for Economics Letters, Journal of Economic Behavior & Organization, and Theory and Decision, and she is a member of the Editorial Board of the Journal of Economic Psychology.

== Research ==
Serra-Garcia's research in behavioral and experimental economics studies how the transmission of information shapes societies — influencing moral behavior, trust in public policies and science, and the adoption of new technologies, including AI. Her work uses laboratory and field experiments, as well as survey data and theoretical models to study deception detection, morality, and trust in information sources.

== Selected publications ==
Serra-Garcia has published widely in leading journals in behavioral and experimental economics. Her most notable publications include:

- "The Attention-Information Tradeoff" (2026), American Economic Review, single-authored lead article in May issue.
- "Enabling or Limiting Cognitive Flexibility? Evidence of Demand for Moral Commitment" (2023), American Economic Review, with Silvia Saccardo.
- "Non-replicable Publications Are Cited More Than Replicable Ones" (2021), Science Advances, with Uri Gneezy.
- "Mistakes, Overconfidence and the Effect of Sharing in Detecting Lies" (2021), American Economic Review, with Uri Gneezy.
- "The Pledging Puzzle: How Can Revocable Promises Increase Charitable Giving?" (2021), Management Science, with James Andreoni.
- "Incentives and Defaults Can Increase COVID-19 Vaccine Intentions and Test Demand" (2023), Management Science, with Nora Szech.
- "Improving Human Deception Detection Using Algorithmic Feedback" (forthcoming), Management Science, with Uri Gneezy.

== Honors and recognition ==
Serra-Garcia has received several awards and fellowships for her research and teaching.

- 2024 – Excellence in Teaching MBA Award, University of California, San Diego
- 2024 – Principal Investigator, National Science Foundation Grant
- 2023 – Brandes Center Fellowship, Rady School of Management
- 2020 – Innovation Grant for Inclusive Research Excellence, UC San Diego
- 2020 – Named one of Poets & Quants “Best 40 Under 40 MBA Professors”
- 2016 – Hellman Fellowship Award, UC San Diego
- 2012 – Nominee for the Distinguished CESifo Affiliate Award (Behavioral Economics)
- 2006–2007 – Excellence Scholarship, Huygens Program, Dutch Science Foundation

== Public engagement ==
Serra-Garcia's research on honesty, deception detection, and the replication crisis has been covered by major news outlets, including The Guardian, The Daily Dot, Ars Technica, and the Times of San Diego. Recent media coverage highlights her work on algorithmic lie detection and the citation patterns of non-replicable research.

Her research on household decision-making has also been featured by NBC 7 San Diego, and her work on vaccine incentives and public health behavior has been covered by KPBS, San Diego’s public media outlet.

She has also written invited pieces featuring her research, including “The Key to Getting People to Donate to Charities: Don’t Push It” in the Wall Street Journal (2015), co-authored with James Andreoni, and an article for the Management Science Review.

Serra-Garcia has discussed her research in several public interviews and podcasts, including the Game Changer Podcast, The Visible Hand Podcast, the Generosity Freakshow Podcast, and BS Uncovered.

She has also delivered invited keynote lectures at major conferences in behavioral and experimental economics, including the Behavioral Economics and Experimental Conference (BEEC) 2025 and the Barcelona School of Economics Summer Forum on Computational and Experimental Economics.
