= Organizational Behavior and Human Decision Processes =

- Discipline: Organizational behavior, organizational psychology, cognitive psychology
- Language: English
- Edited by: Maryam Kouchaki

Publication details
- Former names: Organizational Behavior and Human Performance
- History: 1966-present
- Publisher: Elsevier
- Frequency: Bimonthly
- Impact factor: 5.606 (2021)

Standard abbreviations
- ISO 4: Organ. Behav. Hum. Decis. Process.

Indexing
- ISSN: 0749-5978
- LCCN: 85646244
- OCLC no.: 605928454

Links
- Journal homepage; Online archive

Organizational Behavior and Human Decision Processes is a bimonthly peer-reviewed scientific journal covering organizational behavior and psychology. It was established in 1966 as Organizational Behavior and Human Performance by Academic Press, obtaining its current name in 1985. It is currently published by Elsevier, which acquired Academic Press in 2000. The editor-in-chief is Maryam Kouchaki (Kellogg School of Management, Northwestern University). According to the Journal Citation Reports, the journal has a 2021 impact factor of 5.606.
