= Psychological Science =

- Discipline: Psychology
- Language: English
- Edited by: Simine Vazire

Publication details
- History: 1990–present
- Publisher: SAGE Publications (United States)
- Frequency: Monthly

Standard abbreviations
- ISO 4: Psychol. Sci.

Indexing
- ISSN: 0956-7976 (print); 1467-9280 (web)
- LCCN: 90657004

Links
- Journal homepage

Psychological Science, the flagship journal of the Association for Psychological Science, is a monthly, peer-reviewed scientific journal published by SAGE Publications. It publishes empirical research across all areas of psychology. Most of its articles are research articles, and it also publishes registered reports; it stopped considering short reports on 15 May 2020. Its editor-in-chief has been Simine Vazire (University of Melbourne) since 1 January 2024.

== History ==
The Association for Psychological Science was founded in 1988 as the American Psychological Society, and, according to former APS president Sandra Scarr, one of the new board of directors' first decisions was to launch a flagship journal. The first issue of Psychological Science appeared in January 1990. According to a 2008 APS account, the journal's founding mission was to publish brief research reports, longer articles and perspectives "along the lines of Science", covering every area of psychology, basic and applied.

The founding editor was William K. Estes, at the time William James Professor of Psychology at Harvard University. In his opening editorial, Estes proposed that the new journal be designed to be read as well as referred to, show psychologists the range of work in their science, and present psychological research in a form accessible to educated readers outside the field.

The journal was published bimonthly until it became monthly in 2004. Its original publisher was Cambridge University Press. In May 2009, SAGE announced a ten-year agreement with the society to publish its four journals, including Psychological Science, beginning in 2010; SAGE has been the publisher since then.

The society changed its name to the Association for Psychological Science on 1 January 2006.

== Past editors ==
The following persons have been editors-in-chief:

- Patricia Bauer (Emory University) (2020–2023)
- Stephen Lindsay, University of Victoria (2015–2019)
- Eric Eich, University of British Columbia (2012–2015)
- Robert V. Kail, Purdue University (2007–2012)
- James E. Cutting, Cornell University (2003–2007)
- Sam Glucksberg, Princeton University (1999–2003)
- John F. Kihlstrom, University of California, Berkeley
- William Kaye Estes, Indiana University

== Abstracting and indexing ==
The journal is abstracted and indexed in:

- Social Sciences Citation Index
- Current Contents/Social and Behavioral Sciences
- MEDLINE/PubMed (from volume 11, January 2000)
- PsycInfo (from volume 1, 1990)
- Scopus (from 1990)
