= European Journal of Personality =

- Discipline: Personality psychology
- Language: English
- Edited by: René Mõttus

Publication details
- History: 1987–present
- Publisher: SAGE Publishing
- Frequency: Bimonthly
- Impact factor: 3.910 (2019)

Standard abbreviations
- ISO 4: Eur. J. Pers.

Indexing
- ISSN: 0890-2070 (print); 1099-0984 (web)
- OCLC no.: 44059969

Links
- Journal homepage

The European Journal of Personality (EJP) is the official bimonthly academic journal of the European Association of Personality Psychology covering research on personality, published by SAGE Publishing. According to citation reports based on impact factor, the journal ranked seventh of all the empirical journals in the social-personality field. EJP seeks to promote the development of empirical and theoretical work in personality psychology. It publishes papers relevant to advancing the field of personality in the broadest sense, and encompasses topics such as the nature of personality, expressions of personality in a social context, personality development, and the consequences of personality. EJP also publishes work on methodological advances in research on personality. It is abstracted inservices including PsycINFO and Social Sciences Citation Index.

In 2018 EJP began encouraging authors to submit registered reports. In a registered report, "authors create a study proposal that includes theoretical and empirical background, research questions/hypotheses, and pilot data (if available). Upon submission, this proposal will then be reviewed prior to data collection, and if accepted, the paper resulting from this peer-reviewed procedure will be published, regardless of the study outcomes". The journal also allows for streamlined review, a process in which a paper that was previously rejected elsewhere can be sent in along with the original decision letter and the reviews. These documents can then be used as additional information by the editors at the EJP.
