= Nature Human Behaviour =

Academic journal

- Discipline: Behavioural science
- Language: English
- Edited by: Stavroula Kousta

Publication details
- History: 2017–present
- Publisher: Nature Portfolio
- Frequency: Monthly
- Open access: Hybrid
- Impact factor: 17.5 (2025)

Standard abbreviations
- ISO 4: Nat. Hum. Behav.

Indexing
- ISSN: 2397-3374
- OCLC no.: 1082254684

Links
- Journal homepage; Online access; Online archive

Nature Human Behaviour is a monthly multidisciplinary online-only peer-reviewed scientific journal covering all aspects of human behaviour. It was established in January 2017 and is published by Nature Portfolio. The editor-in-chief is Stavroula Kousta. According to the Journal Citation Reports, the journal has a 2025 impact factor of 17.5.

== Potential Harms Policy ==
In August 2022, the journal published an editorial article called "Science must respect the dignity and rights of all humans", to counter structural inequalities and discrimination in society in science. It stated that editors have the right to amend, refuse, or retract content which can be "disparag[ing]", "exclusionary" or content that "undermines the dignity or rights of specific groups".
