= Registered report =

Scholarly publishing format

A registered report is a scholarly publishing format in which the research question, study design, and analysis plan are peer-reviewed before data are collected or analyzed. This publication model aims to reduce publication bias and improve research transparency by restricting the evaluation of scientific manuscripts to the research question, method, and analysis plan, without consideration of whether the results support the research question or not.

Registered reports are a form of preregistration.

== Process ==
The Registered Reports process occurs in two stages of peer review. In the first stage, known as Stage 1 review, authors submit a detailed study proposal to a journal that offers the Registered Reports format. The proposal typically includes the theoretical rationale, research questions or hypotheses, experimental design, sampling plan, and a preregistered statistical analysis plan. At this point, no data have yet been collected or analyzed.

Peer reviewers evaluate the submission based on the importance of the research question and the quality and rigor of the proposed methodology. Because the preregistration undergoes peer review, Registered Reports introduce an additional quality control mechanism compared with standard preregistration practices in which researchers register study plans independently.

Following Stage 1 review, a journal may reject the submission, request revisions, or grant in-principle acceptance (IPA). In-principle acceptance indicates that the journal commits to publishing the study provided that the authors follow the approved research plan and that the study meets basic quality standards. After receiving in-principle acceptance, researchers conduct the study and analyze the data according to the preregistered plan. Deviations from the preregistration are permitted but must be transparently documented, and their impact on the validity and severity of the statistical tests should be evaluated. Substantial deviations may require additional editorial or peer review.

Once the study has been completed, authors submit the full manuscript, including results and conclusions, for Stage 2 review. Reviewers assess whether the preregistered procedures were followed, evaluate any deviations from the original plan, and examine whether the conclusions are supported by the data. Because publication is already conditionally guaranteed, manuscripts are not rejected on the basis of null or statistically non-significant results, except in rare cases where methodological problems render the study uninformative.

== History ==
Concerns about publication bias in the scientific literature date back to early metascientific studies, such as Sterling's analysis of psychology journals. Several authors proposed publication models in which editorial decisions would be made without knowledge of study results. Rosenthal suggested that reviewers evaluate research procedures before seeing the results in order to reduce bias in editorial decisions. Similarly, Walster and Cleary (1970) argued that decisions about how data should be treated must be made before examining the data and proposed that publication decisions should follow the same principle.

A more explicit proposal to review study protocols prior to data collection was described by Johnson (1975) in the European Journal of Parapsychology. Johnson proposed that researchers submit a manuscript describing the study rationale, hypotheses, and experimental design before conducting the research, and that editors commit to publishing the study regardless of the outcome. This approach was intended to prevent selective reporting and post-hoc modification of hypotheses, as Johnson explain (p. 43):

According to the philosophy of this model, the experimenter should define his problem, formulate his hypothesis, and outline his experiment, prior to commencing his study. He should write his manuscript, stating at least essential facts, before carrying out his investigation. this manuscript, in principle only lacking data in the tables, presentation of the results, and interpretation of the results, should be sent to one or more editors, and the experiment should not initiate his study until at least one of the editors has promised to publish the study, regardless of the outcome of the experiment. in this way we could avoid selective reporting. Furthermore, the experimenter will not be given the opportunity to change his hypotheses in such a way that they “fit” the outcome of the experiment.

The modern Registered Reports format was independently developed and introduced at the journal Cortex by Christopher Chambers in 2013. The format was subsequently adopted by a growing number of journals across scientific disciplines. The first Registered Reports were published in 2014 in a special issue of Social Psychology containing preregistered replication studies.

In 2023, the journal Nature began publishing Registered Reports. In 2026, they expanded Registered Reports to additional research areas and to include both confirmatory and exploratory research.

== Benefits ==
Registered Reports are designed to reduce publication bias and other forms of systematic bias in scientific publishing. Because publication decisions are made before results are known, studies are not preferentially published based on statistically significant outcomes. Another advantage is that peer review occurs earlier in the research process. Feedback from reviewers can improve study design and address potential methodological weaknesses before data collection begins. In addition, researchers know in advance whether their study will be published if they follow the approved protocol, which can be particularly beneficial for projects requiring substantial time or resources. Empirical studies suggest that Registered Reports produce a different distribution of reported results compared with traditional publications. Scheel and colleagues found that approximately 96% of traditional psychology articles reported statistically significant results, whereas only 44% of hypotheses tested in Registered Reports yielded significant findings. Although this difference is correlational and cannot determine causation, it may reflect reduced selective reporting or reduced engagement in practices such as p-hacking after in-principle acceptance. Some studies also suggest that Registered Reports exhibit higher methodological rigor and stronger alignment between research questions and analytical methods than comparable traditional articles.

== Limitations ==
One limitation of the Registered Reports format is that researchers cannot begin data collection until the Stage 1 peer review process has been completed and in-principle acceptance has been granted. This requirement can introduce uncertainty in research timelines. To address this issue, some journals and organizations have implemented scheduled review systems in which researchers announce in advance when they intend to submit a Stage 1 manuscript. Editors then recruit reviewers ahead of time so that peer review can begin immediately after submission. Platforms such as Peer Community in Registered Reports (PCI-RR) have adopted this workflow to accelerate the Stage 1 review process.

Despite these practical limitations, the format has received broad support in the scientific community as a mechanism for reducing publication bias and improving the transparency and rigor of research practices, and no criticisms on the Registered Report format have been published in the scientific literature.
