= Domestic violence against men =

Incidence of domestic violence among the male population

Domestic violence against men is violence or other physical abuse towards men in a domestic setting, such as in marriage or cohabitation. As with domestic violence against women, violence against men may constitute a crime, but laws vary between jurisdictions. Intimate partner violence (IPV) against men is generally less recognized by society than intimate partner violence against women, which can act as a further block to men reporting their situation or otherwise seeking help.

While women are substantially more likely to be injured or killed in incidents of domestic violence, men are less likely to report domestic violence to police than women. Men who report domestic violence can face social stigma regarding their perceived lack of machismo or other denigrations of their masculinity, the fear of not being believed by authorities, and being falsely accused of being the perpetrator. For men and women alike, domestic violence is among the most under-reported crimes worldwide.

Intimate partner violence against men is a controversial area of research, with terms such as gender symmetry, battered husband syndrome and bidirectional IPV provoking debate. Some scholars have argued that those who focus on female-perpetrated violence are part of an anti-feminist backlash, and are attempting to undermine the problem of male-perpetrated abuse by championing the cause of the man, over the serious cause of the abused woman. Others have argued that violence against men is a significant, under-reported problem, and that domestic violence researchers, under the influence of feminism, have ignored this in order to protect the fundamental gains of the battered women's movement, specifically the view that intimate partner abuse is an extension of patriarchal dominance. One of the tools used to generate statistics concerning IPV perpetration, the conflict tactics scale, is especially contentious.

== Prevalence ==
=== Statistics of India ===
In India, 3.6% males have ever faced physical violence by their wives as per the National Family Health Survey - 5, 2019-21.

=== Estimation difficulties ===
Determining the rate of intimate partner violence (IPV) against males can be difficult, as men may be reluctant to report their abuse or seek help.

Statistics indicate that under-reporting is an inherent problem with intimate partner violence irrespective of gender. Supplementary studies carried out in 2001 and from 2004 onwards have consistently recorded significantly higher rates of intimate partner violence (committed against both men and women) than the standard crime surveys. The 2010–2011 report found that whilst 27% of women who experienced intimate partner violence reported it to the police, only 10% of men did so, and whilst 44% of women reported to some professional organization, only 19% of men did so. The Australian Bureau of Statistics reported that 97.2% of men do not report domestic violence to the police, compared to 82.1% of women. In a 2005 report carried out by the National Crime Council in the Republic of Ireland, it was estimated that 5% of men who had experienced violence had reported it to the authorities, compared to 29% of women.

Researchers have demonstrated a degree of socio-cultural acceptance of aggression by women against men as opposed to a general condemnation of aggression by men against women. Male-on-female intimate partner violence has been shown to cause significantly more fear and more severe injuries than female-on-male violence. This can lead to men not considering themselves victims, and/or not realizing the IPV they are experiencing is a crime.

=== Underreporting ===
Some men fear that if they do report to the police, they will be assumed to be the abuser, and placed under arrest. Some male victims fear that people will assume that the woman is the real victim, and must have been acting in self-defense or retaliating for abuse.

Surveys have indicated small proportions of men (less than 20% of victims) will tell the police or a health professional about their victimization. This is perhaps due to well-grounded fears that they will be scorned, ridiculed, or disbelieved by these authorities. A recent research paper by Dr. Elizabeth Bates from the University of Cumbria found that a common experience for male intimate partner violence victims was that no one believed them, or were responded to by laughter, including the police. Some men may not report to police as they did not want to expose their partners to the consequences committing violence, such as causing his partner problems at work. It can also be difficult for male victims to understand that they are the recipients of violence rather than the perpetrator.

=== Estimates of male victimization ===
In England and Wales, the 1995 "Home Office Research Study 191" surveyed 10,844 people (5,886 women and 4,958 men) between the ages of 16 and 59, finding that for the previous year, 4.2% of men had experienced intimate partner violence. Over a lifetime, this figure increased to 14.9% of men. Of the 6.6 million incidents of intimate partner violence in 1995, 3.25 million involved male victims, with 1 million incidents resulting in injury. Since 2004, more detailed annual records have been maintained as a supplementary survey attached to the annual Home Office Crime in England and Wales reports. These reports have consistently recorded significantly higher rates of both male and female victims of intimate partner violence than the standard crime surveys. In the case of male victims, the figures range from a high of 4.5% in 2007/2008 to a low of 3.1% in 2009/2010. In the Republic of Ireland, a 2005 report carried out by the National Crime Council found that 15% of women and 6% of men had suffered severe intimate partner violence in their lifetime, equating to roughly 213,000 women and 88,000 men. In Northern Ireland, police records for 2012 listed 2,525 male victims of domestic violence, an increase of 259 cases from 2011. In 2018, 19.3% of reported domestic violence victims in Scotland were male.

In the United States, the National Violence Against Women Survey carried out by the Department of Justice in 2000, surveyed 16,000 men and women, finding that 7.4% of men reported experienced physical assault by a partner their lifetime, and, 0.9% of men reported experiencing domestic violence in the past year. The Canadian General Social Survey found that 7% had experienced intimate partner violence from 1994 to 1999, and 6% between 2000 and 2005.

Data concerning campus rape, such as from a National Institute of Mental Health and Ms. Magazine study, has found a 1 in 7 sexual assault rate for men in U.S. colleges.

In New Zealand, the twenty-one year Dunedin Multidisciplinary Health and Development Study, published in 1999, reported that of their sample of 1,037 people, 27% of women and 34% of men reported being physically abused by a partner, with 37% of women and 22% of men reporting they had perpetrated intimate partner violence. Also in New Zealand, a 2009 report by the Journal of Applied Social Psychology evaluated samples of university students (35 female, 27 male), general population (34 female, 27 male), and incarcerated participants (15 female, 24 male), and found that 16.7% of the male respondents reported physical abuse (12.9% for students and 15.4% for convicts), while 29.5% reported bidirectional (i.e. both partners commit IPV) violence (14.5% for students and 51.3% for convicts).

The 2006 International Dating Violence Study, which investigated intimate partner violence amongst 13,601 students across thirty-two-nations found that "about one-quarter of both male and female students had physically attacked a partner during that year". It reported that 24.4% of males had experienced minor intimate partner violence and 7.6% had experienced "severe assault".

In 2012, two Swedish studies were released that showed men experienced IPV at rates similar to women—8% per year in one study and 11% per year in the other.

In the United Kingdom, there was a survey that indicated that 9% of males had experienced some form of partner abuse. A growing body of international research indicated that men and women experience Intimate partner violence in some similar proportions. An example might be a recent survey from Canada's national statistical agency that concluded that "equal proportions of men and women reported being victims of spousal violence during the preceding 5 years (4% respectively)."

== Perceptions ==
Stereotypes of men being proactive, powerful, and controlling, and "40 years of feminist tradition" that assumes women are the sole victims of intimate partner violence can make it difficult for men to be believed by others, and can even make it difficult for men to believe people when they are told that they are the victims of partner violence. It is very common for men to avoid reporting or admitting to cases of domestic violence due to various reasons, such as fear of ridicule, embarrassment, and the lack of support. This taboo subject is often trivialized and ignored by society, which makes it hard to determine how prevalent this issue is. Due to the lack of support services and health care professionals, male victims often do not receive the necessary assistance.

=== Society ===
Intimate partner violence against men is generally less recognized by society than intimate partner violence against women.

In a segment for the TV show Putting It Out There on BBC Three, a social experiment was carried out where a woman threatens a man and a man threatens a woman, using the same body language and words, at the same location. They did this for 90 minutes, and it took a few seconds until someone helped the woman. For the woman, seven people attempted to help in the 90 minutes, whilst for the man no one stopped to help. In the experiment, a few people were laughing and taking pictures of the man being threatened by the woman.

=== Support services ===
Parts of support services, especially family protection and child welfare, do not recognise that men can be victim and/or do not understand the psychological control that they may be under due to their partner.

=== Police ===
Victims in Australia reported that when reporting their victimization to support services, they were responded to with ridicule, doubt, and arrests. Police may also refuse to listen to their side of the story.

=== Legal system ===
Analyses of research indicates that frequently the legal system fails to view women who use intimate partner violence against controlling male partners as victims due to gendered high expectations on women to be the "perfect victim" and the culturally pervasive stereotype of the passive, "cowering" battered woman.

Women who assault their male partners are more likely to avoid arrest than men who assault their female partners, because female perpetrators of intimate partner violence tend to be viewed by law enforcement agencies and the courts as victims.

=== Psychologists ===
Psychologists rate that the behavior of the husbands are more likely to be psychologically abusive than wives doing the same actions.

== Social stigma ==
Male victims of violence may face socio-cultural issues such as judgement by male peers, or having their masculinity questioned. For some men, admitting they are the victim of female perpetrated intimate partner violence could feel like admitting that they do not follow the established social role for men, and may be an admission they are unwilling, or unable, to make.

== Minimisation and justification ==
When talking about the domestic violence they face, men often minimise or trivialise their victimisation, and may claim that they were not fearful of the physical violence. This can happen even if the victims feared for their lives. This means that physical violence against men may be far more extensive than what they report. Men may also take a long time to realise that they were victim to physical violence. These factors means that it often takes detailed questioning from interviewers to reveal physical violence and its severity, especially for men in minority backgrounds. For most men questioned, "violence" is not in their vocabulary, but rather terms such as "madness", "manipulation", and "short-tempered", and may only use the term violence after receiving therapy. In the book Unreasonable Men, Seidler writes that men are taught to base evaluations of themselves on external factors.

== Methods ==
=== Role switching ===
Female perpetrators of intimate partner violence may make threats to their husbands that she will report him to authorities for being violent. An example of this happening is screaming and acting as if she had been attacked. Female perpetrators may also have unrelated injuries caused by herself (such as slipping), and falsely blame the man for causing these injuries. Role switching may prolong the violence against the man, and may be considered to be a form of psychological abuse. Role switching is a strategy only available to female perpetrators due to society's perception that women are the only legitimate victims.

== Research ==
Research on domestic violence often focuses on women's victimisation of domestic violence and excludes domestic violence against men. Domestic violence research regarding men generally focuses on male strength, courage, or their desire to demonstrate these traits, rather than their vulnerability to domestic violence. They also often usually focus on men as the perpetrators of violence, and are rarely studied as the victims. A reason for this is the idea in evolutionary psychology that females choose a mate and males compete for a female, making them the "aggressor".

Despite the significant increase in empirical output over the past 15 years, the lack of research on domestic violence still persists. There is still a lot of doubt when it comes to the causes of this violence and the treatment and prevention of it. Some clinicians are reluctant to conduct research on this subject due to the complexity of the issues involved.

=== History ===
Older research often use concepts such as male privilege, patriarchy, and gender inequality. Since then, efforts have been made to make such studies gender neutral. Feminists have argued that domestic violence is only committed by men against women.

In 2008, writing in the Northeastern University Press, Michael P. Johnson decided to rename patriarchal terrorism to intimate terrorism after realising that instead of men exclusively committing serious violence toward their female partners due to patriarchal ideology, women also commit serious and systematic violence toward their male partners due to such ideology. There is very little research on female perpetrated intimate terrorism, or experiences of intimate terrorism with male victims.

== Gender differences ==
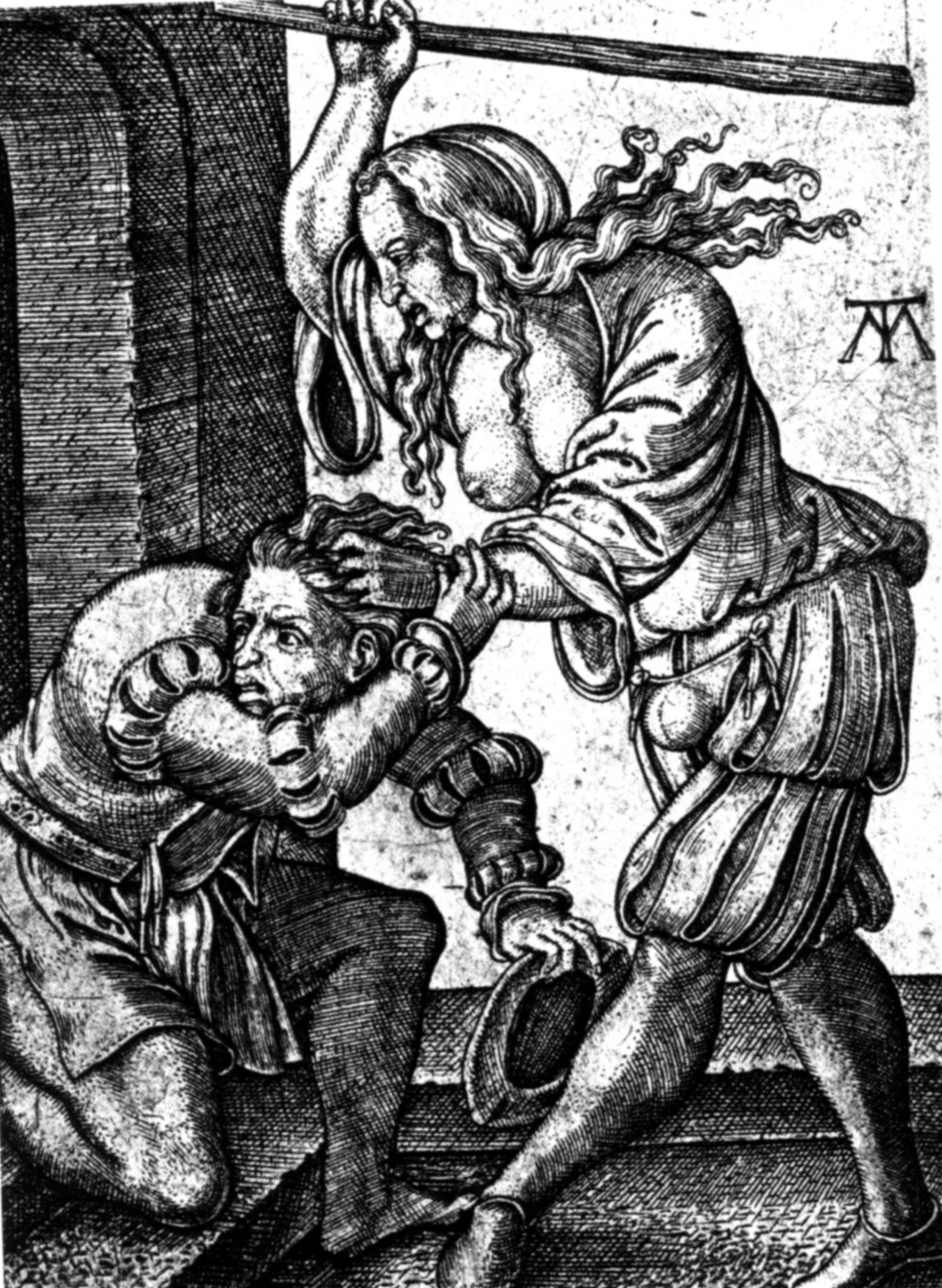
"Femme battant son mari"; Albrecht Dürer.

=== Gender symmetry ===
The theory that women perpetrate intimate partner violence at roughly similar rates as men has been termed "gender symmetry". The earliest empirical evidence of gender symmetry was presented in the 1975 U.S. National Family Violence Survey carried out by Murray A. Straus and Richard J. Gelles on a nationally representative sample of 2,146 "intact families". The survey found 11.6% of women and 12% of men had experienced some kind of intimate partner violence in the last twelve months, also 4.6% of men and 3.8% of women had experienced "severe" intimate partner violence. These unexpected results led Suzanne K. Steinmetz to coin the controversial term "battered husband syndrome" in 1977. Ever since the publication of Straus and Gelles' findings, other researchers in domestic violence have discussed whether gender symmetry really exists, and how to differentiate between victim and batterer.

Since 1975, numerous other empirical studies have found evidence of gender symmetry in intimate partner violence. For example, in the United States, the National Comorbidity Study of 1990-1992 found 18.4% of men and 17.4% of women had experienced minor intimate partner violence, and 5.5% of men and 6.5% of women had experienced severe intimate partner violence. In England and Wales, the 1995 "Home Office Research Study 191" found that in the twelve months prior to the survey, 4.2% of both men and woman between the ages of 16 and 59 had been assaulted by an intimate. The Canadian General Social Survey of 2000 found that from 1994 to 1999, 4% of men and 4% of women had experienced intimate partner violence in a relationship in which they were still involved, 22% of men and 28% of women had experienced intimate partner violence in a relationship which had now ended, and 7% of men and 8% of women had experienced intimate partner violence across all relationships, past and present. The 2005 Canadian General Social Survey, looking at the years 1999–2004 found similar data; 4% of men and 3% of women had experienced intimate partner violence in a relationship in which they were still involved, 16% of men and 21% of women had experienced intimate partner violence in a relationship which had now ended, and 6% of men and 7% of women had experienced intimate partner violence across all relationships, past and present.

From 2010 to 2012, scholars of domestic violence from the U.S., Canada and the U.K. assembled The Partner Abuse State of Knowledge, a research database covering 1700 peer-reviewed studies, the largest of its kind. Among its findings:

- More women (23%) than men (19.3%) have been assaulted at least once in their lifetime.
- Rates of female-perpetrated violence are higher than male-perpetrated (28.3% vs. 21.6%).
- 57.9% of IPV reported was bi-directional, 13.8% was unidirectional male to female, and 28.3% was unidirectional female to male.
- Male dating students are abused more than female dating students.
- Male and female IPV are perpetrated from similar motives.

A 2013 review examined studies from five continents and the correlation between a country's level of gender inequality and rates of domestic violence. The authors found that when partner abuse is defined broadly to include emotional abuse, any kind of hitting, and who hits first, partner abuse is relatively even. They also stated if one examines who is physically harmed and how seriously, expresses more fear, and experiences subsequent psychological problems, domestic violence is significantly gendered toward women as victims.

When Erin Pizzey, founder of the world's first women's refuge; in Chiswick, UK, reported her data showing that men are abused by women almost to the same extent as vice versa, she received death threats from feminists.

=== Bidirectionality ===
An especially controversial aspect of the gender symmetry debate is the notion of bidirectional or reciprocal intimate partner violence (i.e. when both parties commit violent acts against one another). Findings regarding bidirectional violence are particularly controversial because, if accepted, they can serve to undermine one of the most commonly cited reasons for female perpetrated IPV; self-defense against a controlling male partner. Despite this, many studies have found evidence of high levels of bidirectionality in cases where women have reported intimate partner violence. For example, social activist Erin Pizzey, who established the first women's shelter in the U.K. in 1971, found that 62 of the first 100 women admitted to the centre were "violence-prone," and just as violent as the men they were leaving. The 1975 National Family Violence Survey found that 27.7% of intimate partner violence cases were perpetrated by men alone, 22.7% by women alone and 49.5% were bidirectional. In order to counteract claims that the reporting data was skewed, female-only surveys were conducted, asking females to self-report, resulting in almost identical data. The 1985 National Family Violence Survey found 25.9% of IPV cases perpetrated by men alone, 25.5% by women alone, and 48.6% were bidirectional. A study conducted in 2007 by Daniel J. Whitaker, Tadesse Haileyesus, Monica Swahn, and Linda S. Saltzman, of 11,370 heterosexual U.S. adults aged 18 to 28 found that 24% of all relationships had some violence. Of those relationships, 49.7% of them had reciprocal violence. In relationships without reciprocal violence, women committed 70% of all violence. However, men were more likely to inflict injury than women.

In 1997, Philip W. Cook conducted a study of 55,000 members of the United States Armed Forces, finding bidirectionality in 60-64% of intimate partner violence cases, as reported by both men and women. The 2001 National Longitudinal Study of Adolescent Health found that 49.7% of intimate partner violence cases were reciprocal and 50.3% were non-reciprocal. When data provided by men only was analyzed, 46.9% of cases were reported as reciprocal and 53.1% as non-reciprocal. When data provided by women only was analyzed, 51.3% of cases were reported as reciprocal and 49.7% as non-reciprocal. The overall data showed 70.7% of non-reciprocal intimate partner violence cases were perpetrated by women only (74.9% when reported by men; 67.7% when reported by women) and 29.3% were perpetrated by men only (25.1% when reported by men; 32.3% when reported by women). The 2006 thirty-two nation International Dating Violence Study "revealed an overwhelming body of evidence that bidirectional violence is the predominant pattern of perpetration; and this ... indicates that the etiology of ipv is mostly parallel for men and women". The survey found for "any physical violence", a rate of 31.2%, of which 68.6% was bidirectional, 9.9% was perpetrated by men only, and 21.4% by women only. For severe assault, a rate of 10.8% was found, of which 54.8% was bidirectional, 15.7% perpetrated by men only, and 29.4% by women only.

In 2000, John Archer conducted a meta-analysis of eighty-two IPV studies. He found that "women were slightly more likely than men to use one or more acts of physical aggression and to use such acts more frequently. Men were more likely to inflict an injury, and overall, 62% of those injured by a partner were women." By contrast, the U.S. Department of Justice finds that women make up 84% of spouse abuse victims and 86% of victims of abuse by a boyfriend or girlfriend.

As both Fiebert and Archer point out, although the numerical tally of physical acts in these studies has found similar rates of intimate partner violence amongst men and women, and high rates of bidirectionality, there is general agreement amongst researchers that male violence is a more serious phenomenon, primarily, but not exclusively, because male violence tends to inflict more psychological and physical damage than female violence. Male violence produces injury at roughly six times the rate of female violence. Women are also more likely to be killed by their male partners than the reverse (according to the US Department of Justice, 84% of spousal murder victims are female), and women in general are more likely to be killed by their spouses than all other types of assailants combined. In relation to this, Murray A. Straus has written "although women may assault their partners at approximately the same rate as men, because of the greater physical, financial, and emotional injury suffered by women, they are the predominant victims. Consequently, the first priority in services for victims and in prevention and control must continue to be directed toward assaults by husbands."

=== Conflict tactics scale ===
In a 2002 review of the research presenting evidence of gender symmetry, Michael Kimmel noted that more than 90% of "systematic, persistent, and injurious" violence is perpetrated by men. He was especially critical of the fact that the majority of the empirical studies reviewed by Fiebert and Archer used the conflict tactics scale (CTS) as the sole measure of domestic violence, and that many of the studies used samples composed entirely of single people under the age of thirty, as opposed to older married couples. Although the CTS is the most widely used domestic violence measurement instrument in the world, it is also one of the most criticized instruments, due to its exclusion of context variables, inability to measure systemic abuse and motivational factors in understanding acts of violence. For example, the National Institute of Justice cautions that the CTS may not be appropriate for intimate partner violence research at all "because it does not measure control, coercion, or the motives for conflict tactics".

Kimmel argues that the CTS is particularly vulnerable to reporting bias because it depends on asking people to accurately remember and honestly report incidents which have occurred up to a year previously. Even Straus admitted that the data indicates men tend to underestimate their use of violence, and women tend to overestimate their use of violence. "He attempts to control for this by examining only reports from women. Yet this does not correct the bias, because women also tend to underestimate men's use of violence. Furthermore, men and women alike tend to overestimate women's use of violence. Violence by men is expected, so it is not reported; violence by women is not expected, so it is notable and reported." Thus men will overestimate their victimization and underestimate their perpetration, while women will underestimate their victimization and overestimate their perpetration. Barbara J. Morse and Malcolm J. George have presented data suggesting that male underestimation of their partner's violence is more common in CTS based studies than overestimation. Linda Kelly has noted that even when dividing the data provided by CTS based studies into that given by men and that given by women (such as in the 2001 National Longitudinal Study of Adolescent Health), the rate of female perpetrated intimate partner violence remains at roughly the same level. The Dunedin Longitudinal Study interviewed both partners in an attempt to test for intentional bias by the participants but found a high degree of correlation between the two partners. Indeed,

Contrary to expectations, agreement between partners did not vary with the perpetrator's gender or with the type of abusive behavior.

R. Emerson Dobash and Russell P. Dobash have also criticized the CTS, arguing that it is improper to equate male intimate partner violence with female intimate partner violence. They question the methodology behind the CTS, the data which stems from it and the theoretical framework used by investigators who champion it, arguing that male aggression is much more severe than female aggression and the two should not be measured by the same tool on the same scale. Such an approach would make it impossible to compare male and female aggression because there would be no common measurement.

Another critic, Kersti Yllö, who holds Straus and those who use the CTS accountable for damaging the gains of the battered women's movement, by releasing their findings into the "marketplace of ideas". She argues that, as sociologists committed to ending domestic violence, they should have foreseen the controversy such statistics would cause and the damage it could potentially do to battered women. Similarly, Nancy Worcester refers to studies which find evidence of gender symmetry and high levels of bidirectionality as part of the "anti-feminist backlash", arguing that studies which use the CTS demonstrate the "limitations and dangers of a gender-neutral approach to anti-violence work".

Straus argues that it is more harmful to women to attempt to tackle the problem of domestic abuse without proper strategy based on facts: "The research shows that this so-called harmless violence by women because a meta-analysis by Stith and colleagues (2004) found that a woman's perpetration of violence was the strongest predictor of her being a victim of partner violence."

Straus responded to criticism of the CTS by arguing that it is driven by radical-feminists who are uncomfortable with any evidence that women can be as violent as men because it undermines their belief that intimate partner violence is an extension of men's desire to subjugate women; "one of the explanations for denying the evidence on gender symmetry is to defend feminism in general. This is because a key step in the effort to achieve an equalitarian society is to bring about recognition of the harm that a patriarchal system causes. The removal of patriarchy as the main cause of IPV weakens a dramatic example of the harmful effects of patriarchy." Straus also points out that despite being critical of the CTS, numerous feminist researchers use it for their own research, and that it was CTS based studies which first illustrated and brought to the public's attention the extent of the battered women problem in the 1970s.

=== Gender asymmetry ===
Current literature on intimate partner violence has alternative viewpoints in relation to gender symmetry theory. A 2008 review published in journal of Violence and Victims found that although both genders were equally likely to initiative less serious "situational violence", more serious abuse was more likely to be perpetrated by men. It also found that women were more likely to use violence in self-defense or out of fear, while men were more likely commit violence in order to assert control. A 2011 systematic review from the journal of Trauma Violence Abuse also found that the common motives for female on male domestic violence were anger, a need for attention, or as a response to their partner's own violence. Another 2011 review published in the journal of Aggression and Violent Behavior also found that although minor domestic violence was equal, more severe violence was perpetrated by men. It was also found that men were more likely to beat up and choke their partners, while women were more likely to "throw something at their partner, slap, kick, bite, punch, and hit with an object".

== Battered husband syndrome ==
The most controversial aspect of female perpetrated intimate partner violence is the theory of "battered husband syndrome". In reaction to the findings of the U.S. National Family Violence Survey in 1975, Suzanne K. Steinmetz wrote an article in 1977 in which she coined the term as a correlative to "battered wife syndrome". Steinmetz conducted several empirical investigations prior to writing her article. Using a broad-based non-representative sample of fifty-four couples, Steinmetz found male perpetrated intimate partner violence at a rate of 47% and female perpetrated intimate partner violence at a rate of 43%. She further found that while 39% of husbands had thrown objects, 31% of wives had done likewise; 31% of husbands had pushed or shoved their partner, compared to 32% of wives; 20% of husbands had hit their wives, 20% of wives had hit their husbands; 10% of husbands had hit their wives with an object, 10% of wives had hit their husbands with an object. In another study, using a sample of fifty-two Canadian college students, Steinmetz found male perpetrated IPV at a rate of 23% and female perpetrated intimate partner violence at a rate of 21%. Further investigation found that 21% of both husbands and wives had thrown objects; 17% of husbands had pushed or shoved, compared to 13% of wives; 13% of husbands had hit their wives, 13% of wives had hit their husbands; 10% of husbands had hit their wives with an object, 12% of wives had hit their husbands with an object. In a third study, using a random sample of ninety-four people, Steinmetz found male perpetrated intimate partner violence at a rate of 32% and female perpetrated intimate partner violence at a rate of 28%. Further investigation found that 31% of husbands had thrown objects compared to 25% of wives; 22% of husbands had pushed or shoved, compared to 18% of wives; 17% of husbands had hit their wives, 12% of wives had hit their husbands; 12% of husbands had hit their wives with an object, 14% of wives had hit their husbands with an object.

These findings led Steinmetz to conclude that intimate partner violence was roughly reciprocal between husbands and wives, with a similar level of intentionality between men and women; "women are as likely to select physical conflict to resolve marital conflict as are men ... women have the potential to commit acts of violence and under certain circumstances, they do carry out these acts". According to Malcolm J. George, Steinmetz' article "represented a point of departure and antithetical challenge to the otherwise pervasive view of the seemingly universality of female vulnerability in the face of male hegemony exposed by the cases of battered wives".

Steinmetz' colleague, Richard J. Gelles, publicly addressed confusion caused by the research and father's rights groups "significant distortion" of the data in his public response Domestic Violence: Not An Even Playing Field, "Indeed, men are hit by their wives, they are injured, and some are killed. But, are all men hit by women battered? No. Men who beat their wives, who use emotional abuse and blackmail to control their wives, and are then hit or even harmed, cannot be considered battered men. A battered man is one who is physically injured by a wife or partner and has not physically struck or psychologically provoked her."

Steinmetz' claims in her article, and her use of the phrase "battered husband syndrome" in particular, aroused a great deal of controversy, with many scholars criticizing research flaws in her work. In particular, she was criticized for not differentiating between verbal and physical aggression or between intentionality and action (wanting to hit was considered the same as actually hitting). For example, David Finkelhor argues that Steinmetz' methodology was unacceptably unscientific. He argues that her work looks at all violence as fundamentally similar; there is no differentiation between male and female violence, or violence against a child and violence against a wife, such as a mother spanking a child and a father breaking a mother's ribs. Finkelhor sees this as especially important insofar as it does not allow a differentiation between ongoing systemic abuse and once-off violence, or between disciplining a child and beating a partner.

== Causes of female-perpetrated IPV ==
Linda Kelly writes that "in conceding that women do engage in acts of domestic violence, female use of violence is justified as self-defense—a lifesaving reaction of women who are being physically attacked by their male partners. The development of the battered woman syndrome as a defense for crimes committed against abusive male partners, including homicide, evidences the wide acceptance of a woman's use of violence as self-defense." Others have argued that domestic violence against women is not primarily motivated by self-defense. The theory is that when women commit intimate partner violence, it is probably justified because they were previously victims and, therefore, the male was the "primary aggressor." Thus, the woman's violent behavior is caused by her background as a victim. Juan Carlos Ramírez explains that given the socially accepted model of femininity as one of submission, passivity and abnegation, whatever behavior does not follow this stereotype will be perceived in an exaggerated manner as abnormal and violent. Thus, women will be perceived as disproportionately aggressive even if merely defending themselves.

Multiple studies indicate that the majority of women's intimate partner violence against male partners is in the context of being victimized. A 2010 systematic review of the literature on women's perpetration of intimate partner violence found that anger, self-defense and retaliation were common motivations but that distinguishing between self-defense and retaliation was difficult. Other studies indicate that only a small proportion of women identify their intimate partner violence as self-defense. For example, in a 1996 study of 1,978 people in England, 21% of women who admitted to committing intimate partner violence gave self-defense as a reason. More prevalent reasons were "Get through to" (53%), "Something said" (52%) and "Make do something" (26%). In a five-year study of 978 college students from California, concluded in 1997, Martin S. Fiebert and Denise M. Gonzalez found an intimate partner violence rate amongst women of 20%. Within this group, perpetrators were asked to select reasons as to why they assaulted their partner, with the option to choose multiple reasons. The breakdown of reasons had "my partner wasn't sensitive to my needs" as the most prevalent (46%). Also found more frequently than self-defense were "I wished to gain my partner's attention" (44%) and "My partner was not listening to me" (43%).

Looking beyond self-defense, studies have found a range of causes for female-perpetrated intimate partner violence. Writing of the feminist theory which regards reinforcement of patriarchy as a primary cause of intimate partner violence, Murray A. Straus writes "Patriarchy and male dominance in the family are clearly among the causes of intimate partner violence, but there are many others. However, with rare exceptions, current offender treatment programs are based on the assumption that the primary cause is male dominance. Thus, they proceed under an erroneous assumption. Illustrative of this fallacious single-cause approach are the state-mandated offender treatment programs that forbid treating other causes, such as inadequate anger management skills." In 2006, Rose A. Medeiros and Murray A. Straus conducted a study using a sample of 854 students (312 men and 542 women) from two American universities. They identified fourteen specific risk factors common amongst both males and females who had committed intimate partner violence; poor anger management, antisocial personality disorders, borderline personality disorders, pattern of dominating relationships, substance abuse, criminal history, posttraumatic stress disorders, depression, communication problems, jealousy, sexual abuse as a child, stress, and a general attitudinal approval of partner violence. Straus states that most female perpetrated intimate partner violence is not motivated by self-defense, but by a desire to control their partners. In 2014, a study involving 1,104 male and female students in their late teens and early twenties found that women are more likely than men to be controlling and aggressive towards their partners, more likely to demonstrate a desire to control their partners, and more likely to use physical aggression in ensuring that control. The main author of the study, Elizabeth Bates, wrote "this suggests that intimate partner violence may not be motivated by patriarchal values and needs to be studied within the context of other forms of aggression, which has potential implications for interventions."

Other explanations for both male and female-perpetrated intimate partner violence include psychopathology, anger, revenge, skill deficiency, head injuries, biochemical imbalances, feelings of powerlessness, lack of resources, and frustration. Researchers have also found a correlation between the availability of domestic violence services, increased access to divorce, higher earnings for women, and improved laws and enforcement regarding domestic violence with declines in female perpetrated intimate partner violence.

== Criticism ==
Many critics have rejected the research cited by men's rights activists and dispute their claims that such violence is gender symmetrical, arguing that MRAs' focus on women's violence against men stems from a misogynistic political agenda to minimize the issue of men's violence against women and to undermine services to abused women.

Researchers have also found different outcomes in men and women in response to intimate partner violence. A 2012 review from the journal Psychology of Violence found that women suffered disproportionately as a result of IPV especially in terms of injuries, fear, and posttraumatic stress. The review also found that 70% of female victims in one of their studies were "very frightened" in response to intimate partner violence from their partners, but 85% of male victims cited "no fear". The review also found that intimate partner violence mediated the satisfaction of the relationship for women but it did not do so for men.

Gender asymmetry is also consistent with government findings. According to government statistics from the US Department of Justice, male perpetrators constituted 96% of federal prosecution on domestic violence. Another report by the US Department of Justice on non-fatal domestic violence from 2003 to 2012 found that 76 percent of domestic violence was committed against women and 24 percent were committed against men. The sociologist and criminologist Ruth M. Mann has criticised the gender symmetry theory of domestic violence and says that women and children are the main victims of domestic violence.

== Legal activism ==
In 2005, the National Coalition for Men filed a lawsuit against the state of California for funding domestic violence shelters for women only. In 2008, the Court of Appeal ruled in their favor and held that the exclusion of male victims violates men's rights to equal protection and "carries with it the baggage of sexual stereotypes", because "men experience significant levels of domestic violence as victims".

== Responses ==
Police services in several locations have expanded their domestic violence programs and response units in an effort to deal with IPV against men. Shelters specifically for men have been set up in the UK; as of 2010, there are sixty refuge places available to men throughout England and Wales, compared to 7,500 places for women.

The Police Service of Northern Ireland has also campaigned to spread awareness of the problem of male victimization and to promote reporting of incidents. The country's first shelter for male abuse victims, Men's Aid NI, opened in early 2013. Chairman Peter Morris has remarked, "Domestic violence against men can take many forms, including emotional, sexual and physical abuse and threats of abuse. It can happen in heterosexual and same-sex relationships and, as with domestic abuse against females, can go largely unreported."

=== Legal and social responses ===
Intimate partner violence against men was not considered nearly as egregious as against women, both within society at large and within the courts. While men who beat their wives were given stringent punishments by judges, women who beat their husbands were often given little to no punishment, and some were even applauded by judges and bystanders who viewed this behavior as appropriate discipline. Societal gender and marriage expectations were relevant in these discrepancies; many judges and newspaper articles joked that men subjected to intimate partner violence were "weak, pitiful, and effeminate." Men beaten by their wives were seen as "so unmanly that they did not deserve society's care or protection." During the early 1900s, however, women who engaged in physical violence against their husbands were given harsher punishments by judges in hopes of deterring what was perceived as an unfavorable result of the women's rights movement.

== See also ==
- Outline of domestic violence
- Battered person syndrome
- Violence against women
- Violence against men
