= Intimate partner violence =

Domestic violence by an intimate partner

Intimate partner violence (IPV) is domestic violence by a current or former spouse or partner in an intimate relationship against the other spouse or partner. IPV can take a number of forms, including physical, verbal, emotional, economic and sexual abuse. The World Health Organization (WHO) defines IPV as "any behavior within an intimate relationship that causes physical, psychological or sexual harm to those in the relationship, including acts of physical aggression, sexual coercion, psychological abuse and controlling behaviors." IPV is sometimes referred to simply as battery, or as spouse or partner abuse.

The most extreme form of IPV is termed intimate terrorism, coercive controlling violence, or simply coercive control. In such situations, one partner is systematically violent and controlling. This is generally perpetrated by men against women, and is the most likely of the types to require medical services and the use of a women's shelter. Resistance to intimate terrorism, which is a form of self-defense, and is termed violent resistance, is usually conducted by women.

Studies on domestic violence against men suggest that men are less likely to report domestic violence perpetrated by their female intimate partners. Conversely, men are more likely to commit acts of severe domestic battery, and women are more likely to suffer serious injury as a result.

The most common but less injurious form of intimate partner violence is situational couple violence (also known as situational violence), which is conducted by men and women nearly equally, and is more likely to occur among younger couples, including adolescents (see teen dating violence) and those of college age.

== Background ==
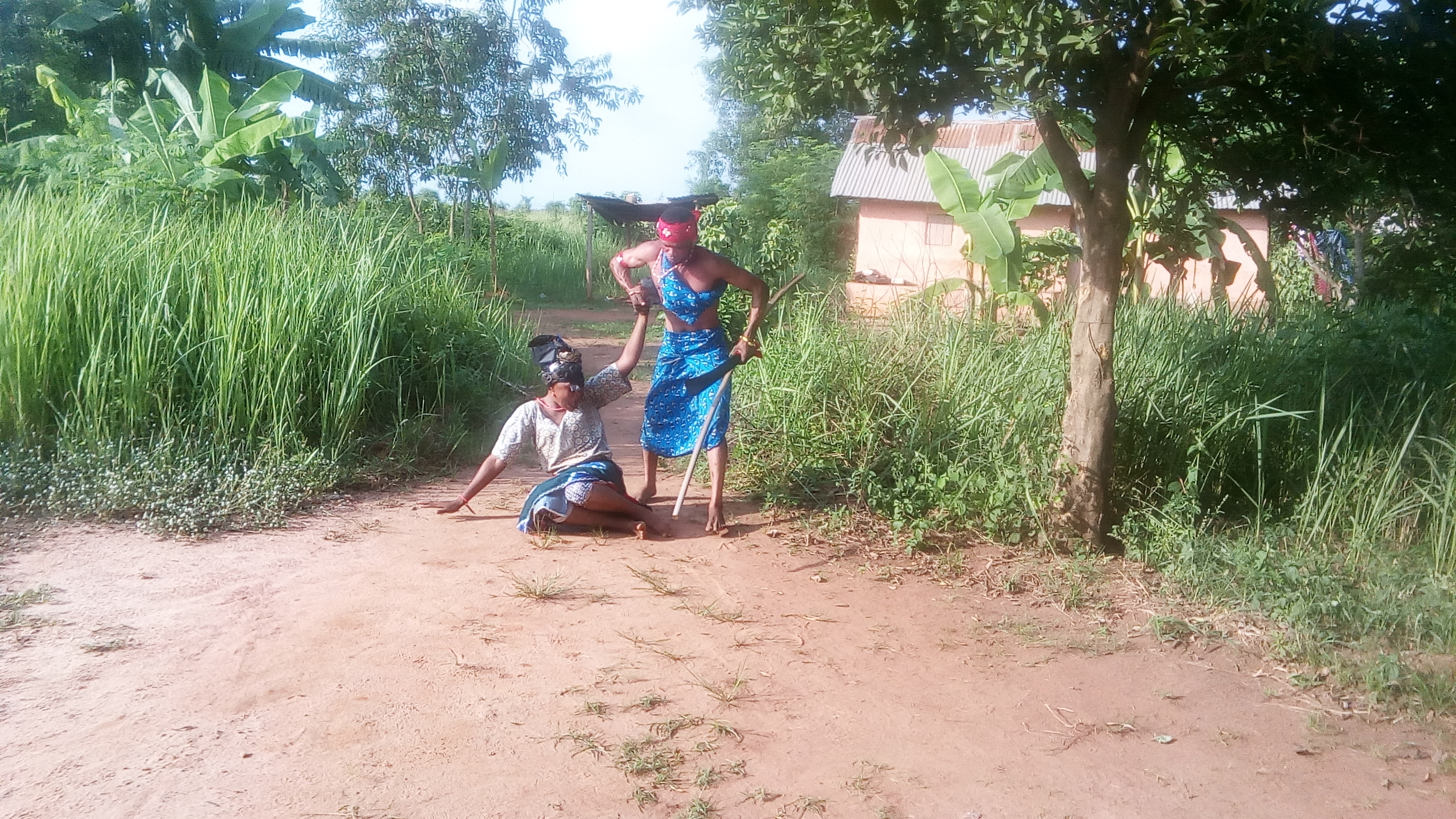
Physical violence against a woman in Benin.

Percentage of women who experienced violence by an intimate partner, 2016

Intimate partner violence occurs between two people in an intimate relationship or former relationship. It may occur between heterosexual or homosexual couples and victims can be male or female. Couples may be dating, cohabiting or married and violence can occur in or outside of the home.

Studies in the 1990s showed that both men and women could be abusers or victims of domestic violence. (Note: Gelles 1980, 1989; McNeely and Mann 1990; Shupe, Stacey, and Hazelwood 1987; Straus 1973; Straus, Gelles, and Steinmetz 1980; Steinmetz 1977/1978.) Women are more likely to act violently in retaliation or self-defense and tend to engage in less severe forms of violence than men whereas men are more likely to commit long-term cycles of abuse than women.

The World Health Organization (WHO) defines intimate partner violence as "any behavior within an intimate relationship that causes physical, psychological or sexual harm to those in the relationship". The WHO also adds controlling behaviors as a form of abuse.

According to a study conducted in 2010, 30% of women globally aged 15 and older have experienced physical and/or sexual intimate partner violence. WHO estimates published in 2023 indicate that 25.8% of women aged 15–49 years who have been in a relationship have experienced physical and/or sexual violence from a current or former husband or male intimate partner at least once in their lives.

Global estimates by WHO calculated that the incidence of women who had experienced physical or sexual abuse from an intimate partner in their lifetime was 1 in 3.

The complications from intimate partner violence are profound. Intimate partner violence is associated with increased rates of substance abuse amongst the victims, including tobacco use. Those who are victims of intimate partner violence are also more likely to experience depression, PTSD, anxiety and suicidality. Women who experience intimate partner violence have a higher risk of unintended pregnancies and sexually transmitted infection, including HIV. This is thought to be due to forced or coerced sex and reproductive coercion (ie. removing a condom during sex or blocking the woman's access to contraception). Children whose parent experiences intimate partner violence are more likely to become victims of IPV themselves or become perpetrators of violence later in life.

Injuries that are frequently seen in victims of IPV include contusions, lacerations, fractures (especially of the head, neck and face), strangulation injuries (a strong predictor of future serious injury or death), concussions and traumatic brain injuries.

Region	Percent
Global	30%
Africa	36.6%
Eastern Mediterranean	37%
European	25.4%
South-East Asia	37.7%
The Americas	29.8%
East Asia	24.6%

== Assessment ==
=== Screening tools ===
The U.S. Preventive Services Task Force (USPSTF) recommends screening women of reproductive age for intimate partner violence, and provide information or referral to social services for those who screen positive.

Some of the most studied IPV screening tools were the Hurt, Insult, Threaten, and Scream (HITS), the Woman Abuse Screening Tool/Woman Abuse Screening Tool-Short Form (WAST/WAST-SF), the Partner Violence Screen (PVS), and the Abuse Assessment Screen (AAS).

The HITS is a four-item scale rated on a 5-point Likert scale from 1 (never) to 5 (frequently). This tool was initially developed and tested among family physicians and family practice offices, and since then has been evaluated in diverse outpatient settings. Internal reliability and concurrent validity are acceptable. Generally, sensitivity of this measure has found to be lower among men than among women.

The WAST is an eight-item measure (there is a short form of the WAST that consists of the first two items only). It was originally developed for family physicians, but subsequently has been tested in the emergency department. It has been found to have good internal reliability and acceptable concurrent validity.

The PVS is a three-item measure scored on a yes/no scale, with positive responses to any question denoting abuse. It was developed as a brief instrument for the emergency department.

The AAS is a five-item measure scored on a yes/no scale, with positive responses to any question denoting abuse. It was created to detect abuse perpetrated against pregnant women. The screening tool has been tested predominantly with young, poor women. It has acceptable test retest reliability.

The Danger Assessment-5 screening tool can assess for risk of severe injury or homicide due to intimate partner violence. A "yes" response to two or more questions suggests a high risk of severe injury or death in women experiencing intimate partner violence. The five questions ask about an increasing frequency of abuse over the past year, use of weapons during the abuse, if the victim believes their partner is capable of killing them, the occurrence of choking during the abuse, and if the abuser is violently and constantly jealous of the victim.

=== Research instruments ===
One instrument used in research on family violence is the Conflict Tactics Scale (CTS). Two versions have been developed from the original CTS: the CTS2 (an expanded and modified version of the original CTS) and the CTSPC (CTS Parent-Child). The CTS is one of the most widely criticized domestic violence measurement instruments due to its exclusion of context variables and motivational factors in understanding acts of violence. The National Institute of Justice cautions that the CTS may not be appropriate for IPV research "because it does not measure control, coercion, or the motives for conflict tactics." The Index of Spousal Abuse, popular in medical settings, is a 30-item self-report scale created from the CTS.

Another assessment used in research to measure IPV is the Severity of Violence Against Women Scales (SVAWS). This scale measures how often a woman experiences violent behaviors by her partner.

== Causes ==
=== Attitudes ===
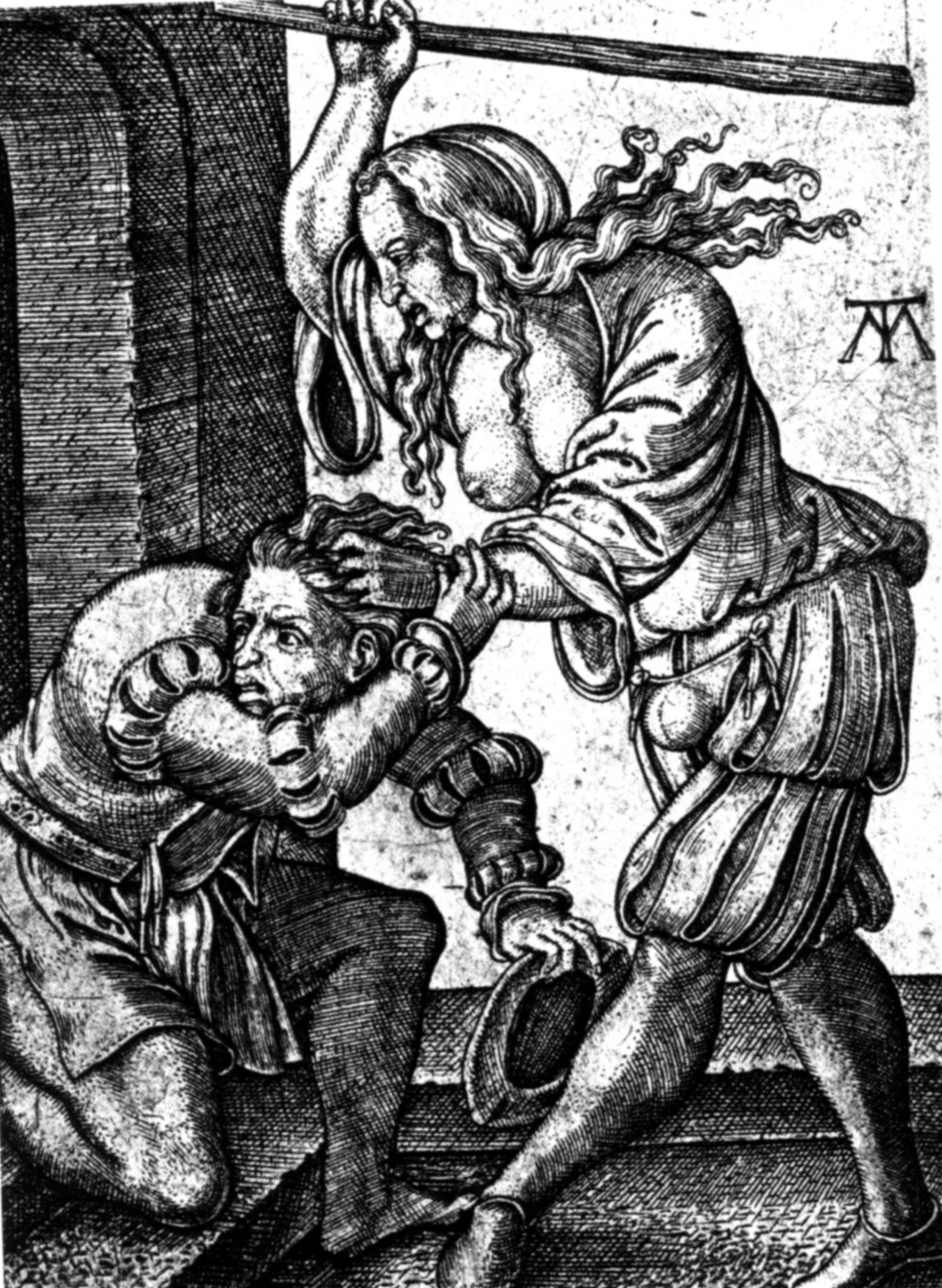
"Femme battant son mari"; Albrecht Dürer

Research based on the Ambivalent Sexism Theory found that individuals who endorse sexist attitudes show a higher acceptance of myths that justify intimate partner violence compared to those who do not. Both students and adults with a more traditional perception of gender roles are more likely to blame the victim for the abuse than those who hold more non-traditional conceptions. Researchers Rollero and Tartaglia found that two dimensions of ambivalent sexism are particularly predictive of violence myth: hostility toward women and benevolence toward men. They both contribute to legitimizing partner violence and this, in turn, leads to undervaluing the seriousness of the abuse.

Various studies have been conducted that link beliefs in myths of romantic love to greater probability of cyber-control perpetration toward the partner in youths aged 18 to 30, and a higher degree of justifying intimate partner violence in adults. Myths of romantic love include beliefs in the power of love to cope with all kind of difficulties, the need of having a romantic relationship to be happy, the belief in jealousy as a sign of love, the perception of love as suffering, and the existence of our soul mate who is our only one true love.

=== Demographics ===
A notice from the National Institute of Justice noted that women who were more likely to experience intimate partner violence had some common demographic factors. Women who had children by age 21 were twice as likely to be victims of intimate partner violence as women who were not mothers at that age. Men who had children by age 21 were more than three times as likely to be people who abuse compared to men who were not fathers at that age. Many male abusers are also substance abusers. More than two-thirds of males who commit or attempt homicide against a partner used alcohol, drugs, or both during the incident; less than one-fourth of the victims did. The lower the household income, the higher the reported intimate partner violence rates. Intimate partner violence impairs a woman's capacity to find employment. A study of women who received AFDC benefits found that domestic violence was associated with a general pattern of reduced stability of employment. Finally, many victims had mental health troubles. Almost half of the women reporting serious domestic violence also meet the criteria for major depression; 24 percent suffer from posttraumatic stress disorder, and 31 percent from anxiety.

=== I³ Theory ===
The I³ Theory (pronounced I-cubed) explains intimate partner violence as an interaction of three processes: instigation, impellance, and inhibition. According to the theory, these three processes determine the likelihood that a conflict would escalate into violence. Instigation refers to the initial provocation or triggering action by a partner, such as infidelity or rejection. The effect of these current events is then shaped by impellance and inhibition. Impelling factors increase the likelihood of violence. Examples of impelling factors include poor communication, alcohol or substance abuse, precarious manhood, impulsive and weak self-regulation, and abuse history. Inhibiting factors decrease the likelihood of violence by overriding the aggressive impulses. Examples of inhibiting factors include empathy, lack of stress, economic prosperity, self-control, and punishment for aggression. Weak instigating triggers, weak impelling factors, and strong inhibiting factors lead to low risk of intimate partner violence. The I³ Theory is useful when describing not only heterosexual male-to-female violence, but violence across other relationship types as well, such as male-to-male, female-to-male, and female-to-female violence.

== Types ==
Michael P. Johnson argues for four major types of intimate partner violence (also known as "Johnson's typology"), which is supported by subsequent research and evaluation, as well as independent researchers. Distinctions are made among the types of violence, motives of perpetrators, and the social and cultural context based upon patterns across numerous incidents and motives of the perpetrator. The United States Centers for Disease Control (CDC) also divides domestic violence into types.

=== Intimate terrorism ===
Intimate terrorism, or coercive controlling violence (CCV), occurs when one partner in a relationship, typically a man, uses coercive control and power over the other partner, using threats, intimidation, and isolation. CCV relies on severe psychological abuse for controlling purposes; when physical abuse occurs it too is severe. In such cases, "[o]ne partner, usually a man, controls virtually every aspect of the victim's, usually a woman's, life." Johnson reported in 2001 that 97% of the perpetrators of intimate terrorism were men.

Intimate partner violence may involve sexual, sadistic control, economic, physical, emotional and psychological abuse. Intimate terrorism is more likely to escalate over time, not as likely to be mutual, and more likely to involve serious injury. The victims of one type of abuse are often the victims of other types of abuse. Severity tends to increase with multiple incidents, especially if the abuse comes in many forms. If the abuse is more severe, it is more likely to have chronic effects on victims because the long-term effects of abuse tend to be cumulative. Because this type of violence is most likely to be extreme, survivors of intimate terrorism are most likely to require medical services and the safety of shelters. Consequences of physical or sexual intimate terrorism include chronic pain, gastrointestinal and gynecological problems, depression, post-traumatic stress disorder, and death. Other mental health consequences are anxiety, substance abuse, and low-self esteem.

Abusers are more likely to have witnessed abuse as children than those who engage in situational couple violence.

Intimate terrorism batterers include two types: "Generally-violent-antisocial" and "dysphoric-borderline". The first type includes people with general psychopathic and violent tendencies. The second type includes people who are emotionally dependent on the relationship. Violence by an individual against their intimate partner is often done as a way for controlling the partner, even if this kind of violence is not the most frequent.

=== Violent resistance ===
Violent resistance (VR), a form of self-defense, is violence perpetrated by victims against their partners who have exerted intimate terrorism against them. Within relationships of intimate terrorism and violent resistance, 96% of the violent resisters are women. VR can occur as an instinctive reaction in response to an initial attack or a defense mechanism after prolonged instances of violence. This form of resistance can sometimes become fatal if the victim feels as though their only way out is to kill their partner.

=== Situational couple violence ===
Situational couple violence, also called common couple violence, is not connected to general control behavior, but arises in a single argument where one or both partners physically lash out at the other. This is the most common form of intimate partner violence, particularly in the western world and among young couples, and involves women and men nearly equally. Among college students, Johnson found it to be perpetrated about 44% of the time by women and 56% of the time by men.

Johnson states that situational couple violence involves a relationship dynamic "in which conflict occasionally gets 'out of hand,' leading usually to 'minor' forms of violence, and rarely escalating into serious or life-threatening forms of violence."

In situational couple violence, acts of violence by men and women occur at fairly equal rates, with rare occurrences of injury, and are not committed in an attempt to control a partner. It is estimated that approximately 50% of couples experience situational couple violence in their relationships.

Situational couple violence involves:

- Mode: Mildly aggressive behavior such as throwing objects, ranging to more aggressive behaviors such as pushing, slapping, biting, hitting, scratching, or hair pulling.
- Frequency: Less frequent than partner terrorism, occurring once in a while during an argument or disagreement.
- Severity: Milder than intimate terrorism, very rarely escalates to more severe abuse, generally does not include injuries that were serious or that caused one partner to be admitted to a hospital.
- Mutuality: Violence may be equally expressed by either partner in the relationship.
- Intent: Occurs out of anger or frustration rather than as a means of gaining control and power over the other partner.

=== Reciprocal and non-reciprocal ===
The CDC divides domestic violence into two types: reciprocal, in which both partners are violent, and non-reciprocal violence, in which one partner is violent. Of the four types, situational couple violence and mutual violent control are reciprocal, while intimate terrorism is non-reciprocal. Violent resistance on its own is non-reciprocal, but is reciprocal when in response to intimate terrorism.

== By gender ==
In the 1970s and 1980s, studies using large, nationally representative samples resulted in findings indicating that women were as violent as men in intimate relationships. This information diverged significantly from shelter, hospital, and police data, initiating a long-standing debate, termed "the gender symmetry debate". One side of this debate argues that mainly men perpetrate IPV (the gender asymmetry perspective), whereas the other side maintains that men and women perpetrate IPV at about equal rates (gender symmetry perspective). However, research on gender symmetry acknowledges asymmetrical aspects of IPV, which show that men use more violent and often deadly means of IPV. Older conflict tactics scale (CTS) methodology was criticized for excluding two important facets in gender violence: conflict-motivated aggression and control-motivated aggression. For example, women commonly engage in IPV as a form of self-defense or retaliation.

Research has shown that the nature of the abuse inflicted by women upon male partners is different from the abuse inflicted by men, in that it is generally not used as a form of control and does not cause the same levels of injury or fear of the abusive partner. Scholars state these cases should not be generalized and each couple's specificities must be assessed. A 2016 meta-analysis indicated that the only risk factors for the perpetration of intimate partner violence that differ by gender are witnessing intimate partner violence as a child, alcohol use, male demand, and female withdrawal communication patterns.

The Centers for Disease Control and Prevention reports that in the United States, 41% of women and 26% of men experience intimate partner violence within their lifetime.

=== Gender asymmetry ===
While both women and men can be victims and perpetrators of IPV, the majority of such violence is inflicted upon women, who are also much more likely to suffer injuries as a result, in both heterosexual and same-sex relationships. Although men and women commit equivalent rates of unreported minor violence via situational altercation, more severe perpetration and domestic battery tends to be committed by men. This is based on newer CTS methodology as opposed to older versions that did not take into account the contexts in which violence takes place. A 2008 systematic review published in journal of Violence and Victims found that despite less serious altercation or violence being equal among both men and women, more serious and violent abuse was perpetrated by men. It was also found that women's use of physical violence was more likely motivated by self-defense or fear whereas men's use of violence was motivated by control. A 2010 systematic review published in the journal of Trauma Violence Abuse found that the common motives for female on male IPV were anger, a need for attention, or as a response to their partner's violence. A 2011 review published in the journal of Aggression and Violent behavior found differences in the methods of abuse employed by men and women, suggesting that men were more likely to "beat up, choke or strangle" their partners, whereas women were more likely to "throw something at their partner, slap, kick, bite, punch, or hit with an object".

Researchers such as Michael S Kimmel have criticized CTS methodology in assessing relations between gender and domestic violence. Kimmel argued that the CTS excluded two important facets in gender violence: conflict-motivated aggression and control motivated aggression. The first facet is a form of family conflict (such as an argument) while the latter is using violence as a tool for control. Kimmel also argued that the CTS failed to assess for the severity of the injury, sexual assaults and abuse from ex-partners or spouses.

Women generally suffer more severe and long-lasting forms of partner abuse than men, and men generally have more opportunities to leave an abusive partner than women do. Researchers have found different outcomes in men and women in response to such abuse. A 2012 review from the journal Psychology of Violence found that women were more likely to suffer physical and psychological harm as a result of partner violence. The review also found that 70% of female victims felt frightened as a result of violence perpetrated by their partners whereas 85% of male victims expressed "no fear" in response to such violence. Lastly, IPV correlated with relationship satisfaction for women but it did not do so for men.

According to government statistics from the US Department of Justice, male perpetrators constituted 96% of federal prosecution on domestic violence. Another report by the US Department of Justice on non-fatal domestic violence from 2003 to 2012 found that 76% of domestic violence was committed against women and 24% was committed against men. According to the United Nations Office on Drugs and Crime, the percentage of victims killed by their spouses or ex-spouses was 77.4% for women and 22.6% for men in 2008 in selected countries across Europe.

Globally, men's perpetration of intimate partner violence against women often stems from conceptions of masculinity and patriarchy. Studies done in the United States, Nigeria, and Guatemala all support the idea of men reacting violently towards their partners when their masculinity is threatened by changing gender roles. Recent scholarship draws attention to the complexity of interactions between conceptions of masculinity and factors such as colonialism, racism, class and sexual orientation in shaping attitudes toward intimate partner violence around the world.

=== Gender symmetry ===
The theory that women perpetrate intimate partner violence (IPV) at roughly the same rate as men has been termed "gender symmetry." The earliest empirical evidence of gender symmetry was presented in the 1975 U.S. National Family Violence Survey carried out by Murray A. Straus and Richard J. Gelles on a nationally representative sample of 2,146 "intact families." The survey found 11.6% of men and 12% of women had experienced some kind of IPV in the last twelve months, while 4.6% of men and 3.8% of women had experienced "severe" IPV.

These unexpected results led Suzanne K. Steinmetz to coin the controversial term "battered husband syndrome" in 1977. Ever since the publication of Straus and Gelles' findings, other researchers into domestic violence have disputed whether gender symmetry really exists. Sociologist Michael Flood writes, "there is no 'gender symmetry' in domestic violence; there are important differences between men's and women's typical patterns of victimization; and domestic violence represents only a small proportion of the violence to which men are subject".

Other empirical studies since 1975 suggest gender symmetry in IPV. Such results may be due to a bi-directional or reciprocal pattern of abuse, with one study concluding that 70% of assaults involve mutual acts of violence. According to Ko Ling Chan in a literature review of IPV, studies generally support the theory of gender symmetry if "no contexts, motives, and consequences are considered".

A 2008 systematic review found that while men and women perpetrate roughly equal levels of the less harmful types of domestic violence, termed "situational couple violence", men are much more likely than women to perpetrate "serious and very violent 'intimate terrorism'". This review also found that "women's physical violence is more likely than men's violence to be motivated by self-defense and fear, whereas men's physical violence is more likely than women's to be driven by control motives."

A 2010 systematic review found that women's perpetration of IPV is often a form of violent resistance as a means of self-defense and/or retaliation against their violent male partners, and that it was often difficult to distinguishing between self-defense and retaliation in such contexts.

A 2013 review of evidence from five continents found that when partner abuse is defined broadly (emotional abuse, any kind of hitting, who hits first), it is relatively even. However, when the review examined who is physically harmed and how seriously, expresses more fear, and experiences subsequent psychological problems, domestic violence primarily affects women. A sample from Botswana demonstrated higher levels of mental health consequences among females experiencing IPV, contrasting the results with males and females who experience IPV in Pakistan for which similar levels of mental health consequences were found.

== Sexual violence ==
Sexual violence by intimate partners varies by country, with an estimated 15 million adolescent girls surviving rape worldwide. In some countries forced sex, or marital rape, often occurs with other forms of domestic violence, particularly physical abuse.

== Treatment ==
=== Individual treatment ===
Due to the high prevalence and devastating consequences of IPV, approaches to decrease and prevent violence from re-occurring is of utmost importance. Initial police response and arrest is not always enough to protect victims from recurrence of abuse; thus, many states have mandated participation in batterer intervention programs (BIPs) for men who have been charged with assault against an intimate partner. Most of these BIPs are based on the Duluth model and incorporate some cognitive behavioral techniques.

The Duluth model is one of the most common current interventions for IPV. It represents a psycho-educational approach that was developed by paraprofessionals from information gathered from interviewing battered women in shelters and using principles from feminist and sociological frameworks. One of the main components used in the Duluth model is the 'power and control wheel', which conceptualizes IPV as one form of abuse to maintain male privilege. Using the 'power and control wheel', the goal of treatment is to achieve behaviors that fall on the 'equality wheel' by re-educate men and by replacing maladaptive attitudes held by men.

Cognitive behavioral therapy (CBT) techniques focus on modifying faulty or problematic cognitions, beliefs, and emotions to prevent future violent behavior and include skills training such as anger management, assertiveness, and relaxation techniques.

Overall, the addition of Duluth and CBT approaches results in a 5% reduction in IPV. This low reduction rate might be explained, at least in part, by the high prevalence of bidirectional violence as well as client-treatment matching versus "one-size-fits-all" approaches.

Achieving change through values-based behavior (ACTV) is a newly developed Acceptance and Commitment Therapy (ACT)-based program. Developed by domestic violence researcher Amie Zarling and colleagues at Iowa State University, the aim of ACTV is teach abusers "situational awareness"—to recognize and tolerate uncomfortable feelings – so that they can stop themselves from exploding into rage.

Initial evidence of the ACTV program has shown high promise: Using a sample 3,474 men who were arrested for domestic assault and court-mandated to a BIP (either ACTV or Duluth/CBT), Zarling and colleagues showed that compared with Duluth/CBT participants, significantly fewer ACTV participants acquired any new charges, domestic assault charges, or violent charges. ACTV participants also acquired significantly fewer charges on average in the one year after treatment than Duluth/CBT participants.

Psychological therapies for women probably reduce the resulting depression and anxiety, however it is unclear if these approaches properly address recovery from complex trauma and the need for safety planning.

=== Conjoint treatment ===
Some estimates show that as many as 50% of couples who experience IPV engage in some form of reciprocal violence. Nevertheless, most services address offenders and survivors separately. In addition, many couples who have experienced IPV decide to stay together. These couples may present to couples or family therapy. In fact, 37-58% of couples who seek regular outpatient treatment have experienced physical assault in the past year. In these cases, clinicians are faced with the decision as to whether they should accept or refuse to treat these couples. Although the use of conjoint treatment for IPV is controversial as it may present a danger to victims and potentially escalate abuse, it may be useful to others, such as couples experiencing situational couple violence. Scholars and practitioners in the field call for tailoring of interventions to various sub-types of violence and individuals served.

Behavioral couple's therapy (BCT) is a cognitive-behavioral approach, typically delivered to outpatients in 15-20 sessions over several months. Research suggests that BCT can be effective in reducing IPV when used to treat co-occurring addictions, which is important work because IPV and substance abuse and misuse frequently co-occur.

Domestic conflict containment program (DCCP) is a highly structured skills-based program whose goal is to teach couples conflict containment skills.

Physical aggression couples treatment (PACT) is a modification of DCCP, which includes additional psychoeducational components designed to improve relationship quality, including such things as communication skills, fair fighting tactics, and dealing with gender differences, sex, and jealousy.

The primary goal of domestic violence focused couples treatment (DVFCT) is to end violence with the additional goal of helping couples improve the quality of their relationships. It is designed to be conducted over 18 weeks and can be delivered in either individual or multi-couple group format.

=== Advocacy ===
Advocacy interventions have also been shown to have some benefits under specific circumstances. Brief advocacy may provide short-term mental health benefits and reduce abuse, particularly in pregnant women.

=== Prevention ===
Home visitation programs for children from birth up to two years old, with included screening for parental IPV and referral or education if screening is positive, have been shown to prevent future risk of IPV. Universal harm reduction education to patients in reproductive and adolescent healthcare settings has been shown to decrease certain types of IPV.

== See also ==
- Domestic violence
- Child abuse
- Femicide
- Corporal punishment
- Honor killing
- Intimate partner violence and U.S. military populations
- Marital rape
- Sexual violence by intimate partners
- Info-graphic on intimate partner violence, sexual violence, and stalking from the US Centers for Disease Control and Prevention available on Wikimedia Commons
