= Gelles (surname) =

Gelles is a surname. Notable people with the surname include:

- Edith B. Gelles, American author and historian
- Judy S. Gelles (1944–2020), American artist
- Michael Gelles, American forensic psychologist
- Richard Gelles (1946–2020), American writer and sociologist

== See also ==
- Gelles, locality in France
- Geller, another surname
