= Woozle effect =

False credibility due to quantity of citations

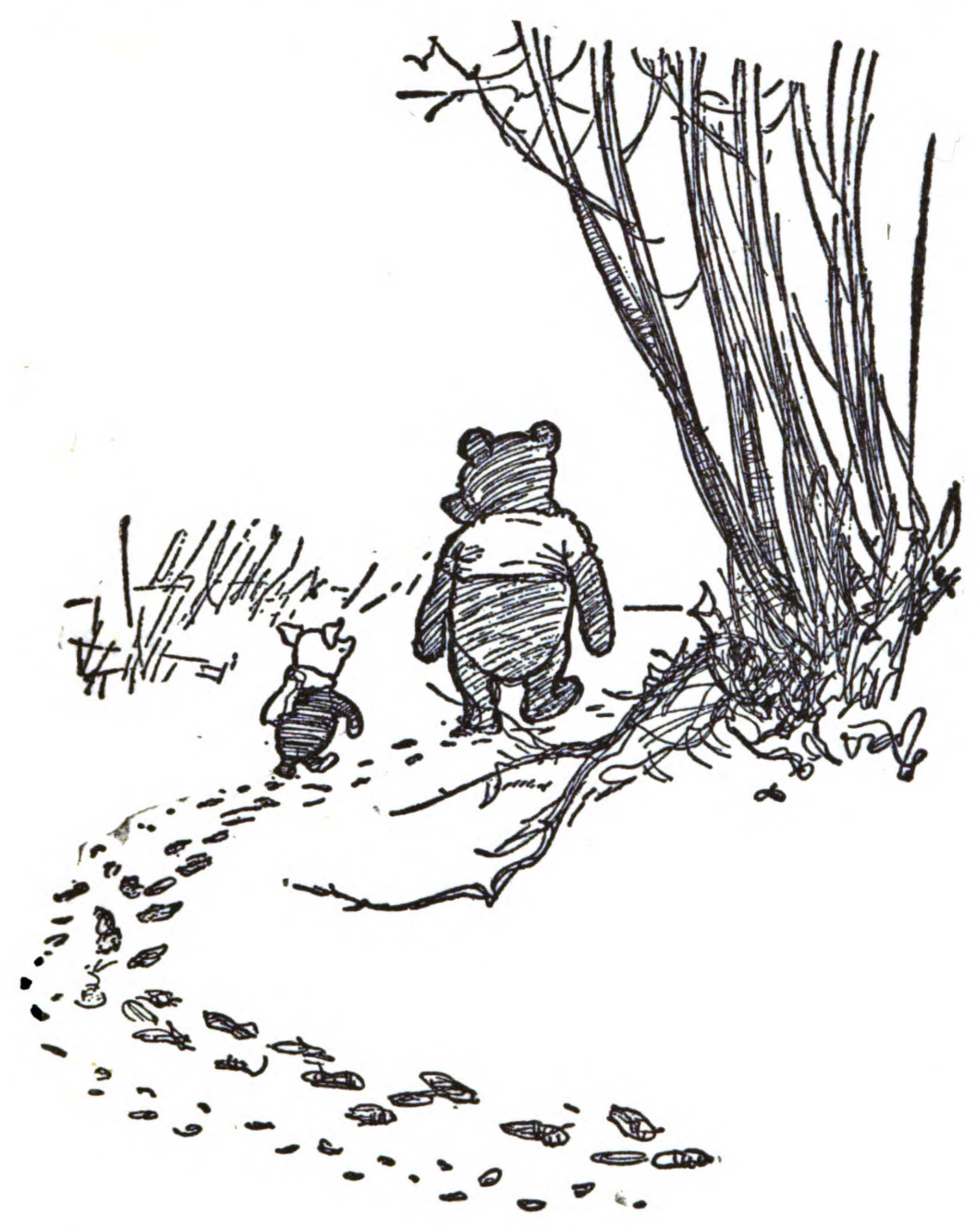
Piglet and Pooh go in circles hunting a Woozle—but the tracks they follow are merely their own.

The Woozle effect, also known as evidence by citation, occurs when a source is widely cited for a claim that the source does not adequately support, giving said claim undeserved credibility. If results are not replicated and no one notices that a key claim was never well-supported in its original publication, faulty assumptions may affect further research.

The Woozle effect is somewhat similar to circular reporting in journalism, where someone makes a questionable claim, and a journalist unthinkingly accepts the claim and republishes it without realizing its dubious and unreliable origins. In turn, other journalists and the public then continue to repeat and duplicate the unsupported claim.

== Origin and definition ==
A Woozle is an imaginary character in the A. A. Milne book Winnie-the-Pooh, published in 1926. In chapter three, "In which Pooh and Piglet Go Hunting and Nearly Catch a Woozle", Winnie-the-Pooh and Piglet start following tracks left in snow believing they are the tracks of an imaginary animal called a woozle. The tracks keep multiplying until Christopher Robin explains to them that they have been following their own tracks in circles around a spinney.

Prior to the introduction of the specific term "Woozle effect", the underlying concept dates back over 60 years. Bevan (1953), writing about scientific methodology and research errors in the field of psychology, uses the term "scientific woozle hunters". Wohlwill (1963) refers to a "hunt for the woozle" in social science research, and Stevens (1971) cautions readers about woozles in the study of a misquoted letter.

The term "woozle effect" was coined by Beverly D. Houghton in 1979 during a panel discussion, in order: "...to critique the burgeoning belief in a myth/archetype [of] the batterer emerging from the [then] virtually nonexistent literature and the popular press." More recently she described the effect as "reification-by-accretion". Other researchers have attributed the term to Richard Gelles (1980), and to Gelles and Murray A. Straus (1988). Gelles and Straus argue that the woozle effect describes a pattern of bias seen within social sciences and which is identified as leading to multiple errors in individual and public perception, academia, policy making, and government.

A woozle is also a claim, made about research, that is not supported by original findings. According to Donald G. Dutton, a woozle effect, or a woozle, occurs when frequent citation of previous publications that lack evidence misleads individuals, groups and the public into thinking or believing there is evidence, and non-facts become urban myths and factoids. The creation of woozles is often linked to the changing of language from qualified ("it may", "it might", "it could") to absolute form ("it is"), firming up language and introducing ideas and views not held by an original author or supported by evidence.

Dutton sees the woozle effect as an example of confirmation bias and links it to belief perseverance and groupthink. Because in the social sciences empirical evidence may be based on experiential reports rather than objective measurements, there may be a tendency for researchers to align evidence with expectation. According to Dutton, it is also possible that the social sciences may be likely to align with contemporary views and ideals of social justice, leading to bias in favor of those ideals. Gambrill (2012) links the woozle effect to the processes that create pseudoscience. Gambrill and Reiman (2011) also link it with more deliberate propaganda techniques; they also identify introductory phrases like "Every one knows ...", "It is clear that ...", "It is obvious that ...", "It is generally agreed that ..." as alarm bells that what follows might be a Woozle line of reasoning.

== Examples ==
In 1980, Gelles illustrated the Woozle effect, showing how work by Gelles (1974) based on a small sample and published in The Violent Home by Straus, who had written the foreword for Gelles's book, was presented as if it applied to a large sample. Both of these were then cited by Langley & Levy in their 1977 book, Wife Beating: The Silent Crisis. In the 1998 book Intimate Violence, Gelles and Straus use the Winnie-the-Pooh woozle to illustrate how poor practice in research and self-referential research causes older research to be taken as fresh evidence causing error and bias.

One notable example of the effect can be seen in citations of "Addiction Rare in Patients Treated with Narcotics", a letter to the editor by Jane Porter and Hershel Jick published by the New England Journal of Medicine in 1980. The letter, which was five sentences long and unlikely to have been peer reviewed according to a NEJM spokesperson, reported findings from analysis of medical records regarding the use of pain medication for hospital patients and concluded that "despite widespread use of narcotic drugs in hospitals, the development of addiction is rare in medical patients with no history of addiction". Although the study only concerned use of narcotics in hospital settings, over time it was increasingly cited to support claims that addiction to painkillers was similarly uncommon among patients prescribed narcotics to take at home. The authors of a 2017 letter published in the NEJM concerning the original 1980 letter found 608 citations of Porter and Jick, with a "sizable increase" after the release of OxyContin in 1995: Purdue Pharma, the manufacturers of OxyContin, cited the Porter and Jick study, as well as others, to argue that it carried a low risk of addiction. In 2007, Purdue and three of the company's senior executives pleaded guilty to federal criminal charges that they had misled regulators, physicians and patients about the addiction risk associated with taking OxyContin. The 1980 study was also misrepresented in both academic and non-academic publications: it was described as an "extensive study" by Scientific American, whilst Time said that it was a "landmark study" showing that "exaggerated fear that patients would become addicted" to opiates was "basically unwarranted", and an article in the journal Seminars in Oncology claimed that the Porter and Jick study examined cancer patients when the letter made no mention of what illnesses the patients were suffering from. The authors of the 2017 NEJM letter suggested that the inappropriate citations of the 1980 study played a role in the North American opioid epidemic by under-representing the risk of addiction: the page for the Porter and Jick letter on the Journal's website now includes a note informing the reader that it "has been 'heavily and uncritically cited' as evidence that addiction is rare with opioid therapy".

In a study conducted by the Vera Institute of Justice, Weiner and Hala (2008) reported some of the research-related difficulties associated with measuring human trafficking. They describe and map the unfolding of the Woozle effect in connection with prevalence estimates of human trafficking. Searching the relevant literature between 1990 and 2006, Weiner and Hala found 114 prevalence estimates in 45 publications. Only one of the publications cited original research, and several prevalence estimates appeared unsourced. The authors concluded that the sources they reviewed lacked citations, adequate operational definition, and discussion of methodology. Stransky and Finkelhor (2008/2012) criticize the general methodology involved in human trafficking research. They cite the Woozle effect and post a prominent warning on the first page of their report cautioning against citing any specific estimates they present, as the close inspection of the figures "...reveals that none are based on a strong scientific foundation."

Gambrill and Reiman (2011) analyze scientific papers and mass-market communications about social anxiety and conclude that many of them engage in disease mongering by presenting the disease model of social anxiety as an incontrovertible fact by resorting to unchallenged repetition techniques and by leaving out of the discourse any competing theories. Gambrill and Reiman further note that even after educating their subjects about the tell-tale signs of such techniques, many of them still failed to pick up the signs in a practical test.

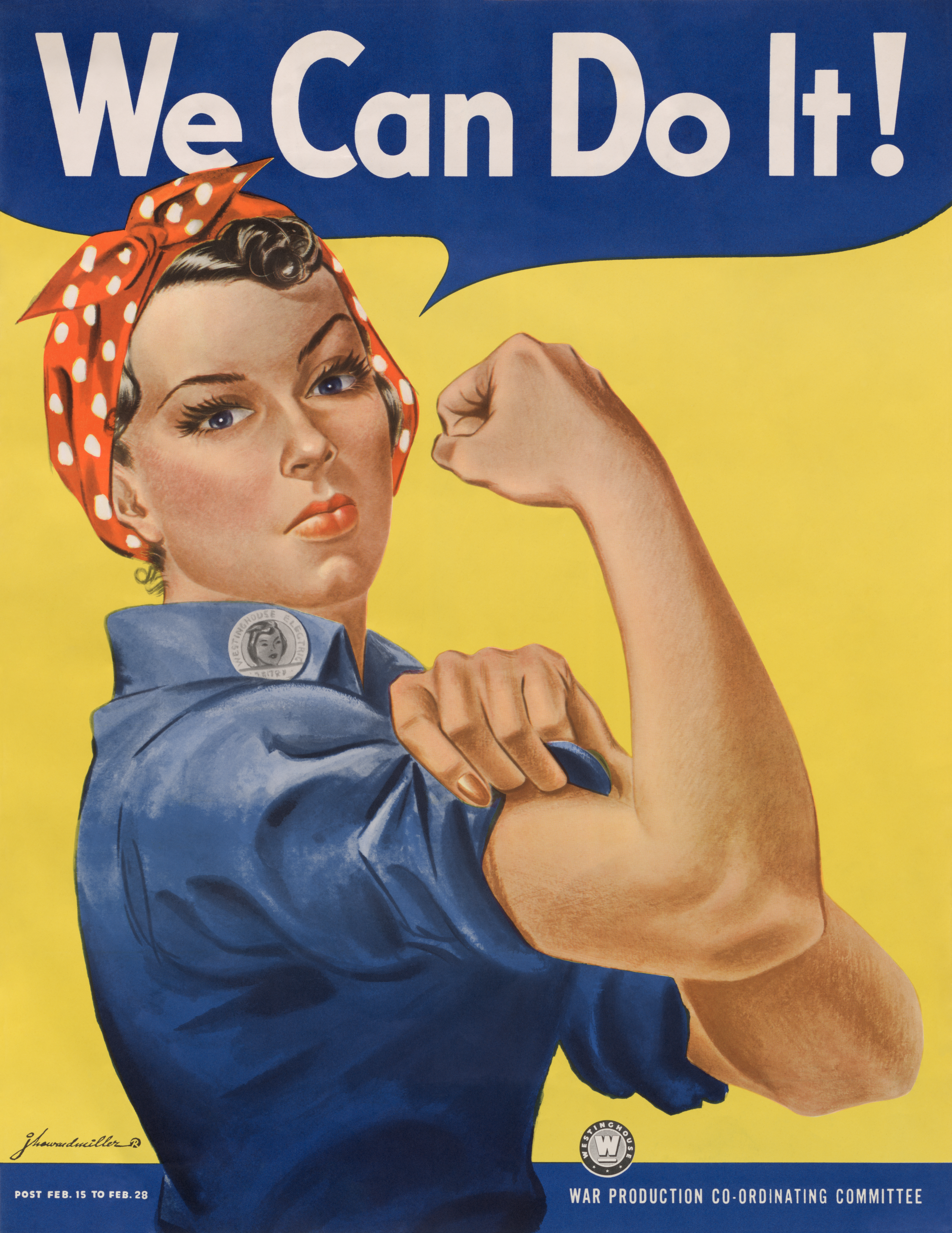
Geraldine Hoff Doyle claimed to have been the inspiration for the "We Can Do It!" poster, achieving fame and honors when her statement – likely false – was repeated without confirmation.

James J. Kimble gives as an example the 1994–2015 historiography of the 1943 American "We Can Do It!" wartime poster. After Michigan resident Geraldine Hoff Doyle said in 1994 that she was the real-life model for the poster, many sources repeated her assertion without checking the two foundational assumptions: that Doyle was the young factory worker pictured in a 1942 wartime photograph, and that the photograph had inspired commercial artist J. Howard Miller to create the poster. Though some media representations described the connection as unconfirmed, many more enthusiastically endorsed it. The weight of these multiple endorsements gave Doyle's story a "convincing" authority, despite the lack of authority in establishing the connection. In 2015, Kimble found the original photographic print of the factory worker, its caption identifying the young woman as Naomi Parker, working in California in March 1942, when Doyle was still in high school.

== See also ==
- Ant mill – Ants continuously walking in a circle
- Argument from authority – Logical fallacy
- Argumentum ad populum – Fallacy of claiming the majority is always correct ("Argument from popularity")
- Circular reasoning – Logical fallacy in which the conclusion provides the premise
- Circular reporting – Apparently multiple sources for single-source data, also known as citogenesis
- Echo chamber (media) – Situation that reinforces beliefs by repetition inside a closed system
- Fallacy – Argument that uses faulty reasoning
- Idola theatri – Type of tendency towards logical fallacy ("idols of the theatre")
- Just-so story – Unverifiable narrative explanation
- Meme – Cultural idea that spreads through imitation
- Publication bias – Higher probability of publishing results showing a significant finding
- Source criticism – Process of evaluating an information source
- Three men make a tiger – Chinese proverb about communal reinforcement by repetition of an unfounded premise
- Viral phenomenon – Self-replicating objects or patterns
- Weasel word – Words or phrases using vague claims to appear meaningful
- White hat bias – Type of bias in public health research
- Wikiality – Neologism combining Wiki and reality

== Sources ==
- Dutton, Donald G. (2006). Rethinking Domestic Violence. UBC Press. ISBN 978-0-7748-1304-4.
- Gelles, Richard J. (1974). The Violent Home: A Study of Physical Aggression Between Husbands and Wives. Sage Publications. ISBN 978-0-8039-0381-4.
- Gelles, Richard J. (1980). "Violence in the Family: A Review of Research in the Seventies". Journal of Marriage and Family. 42 (4): 873–885. doi:10.2307/351830. JSTOR 351830.
- Gelles, Richard J.; Straus, Murray Arnold (1988). Intimate Violence. Simon and Schuster. ISBN 978-0-671-61752-3.
- Stransky, Michelle; Finkelhor, David (2012) [2008]. Sex trafficking of minors: How many juveniles are being prostituted in the US? (PDF) (Report). Crimes Against Children Research Center. pp. 1–4. Archived from the original (PDF) on 22 February 2014.
- Suss, Richard A. (2021). "ASPECTS, The Mismeasure of Stroke: A Metrological Investigation". OSF Preprints. doi:10.31219/osf.io/c4tkp. S2CID 242764761.
