= Philip Cook =

Philip Cook or Philip Cooke may refer to:

- Philip St. George Cooke (1809–1895), U.S. Army cavalry officer
- Philip Pendleton Cooke (1816–1850), American lawyer and minor poet from Virginia
- Philip Cook (general) (1817–1894), general in the army of the Confederate States of America and U.S. Representative from Georgia
- Philip Cooke (judge) (1893–1956), New Zealand lawyer and judge
- Philip J. Cook (born 1946), American sociologist and criminologist
- Philip W. Cook, American journalist
- Phil Cooke (born 1954), American writer, television producer and media consultant
- Philip Cook (bishop) (1875–1938), Episcopal bishop of Delaware
- Hal Cook (Philip Halford Cook; 1912–1990), Australian public servant
- Phil Cook (musician), American musician and member of Megafaun
