= Index of Spousal Abuse =

Scale to measure domestic violence

The Index of Spousal Abuse (ISA) is a 30-item self-report scale developed to measure the severity of physical and non-physical aggression inflicted on a woman by her spouse or partner. The ISA has become a popular measure in medical settings. It was created from the conflict tactics scale, one of the earliest instruments used to identify violence between partners by measuring interpersonal aggression, in which 19 items pertain to non-physical abuse and 11 pertain to physical abuse. Each item is rated on a scale from 1 (never) to 5 (very frequently). Both of these scales are part of assessing the cycle of abuse.
