= Elizabeth Regosin =

American historian (born 1967)

- Born: Elizabeth Ann Regosin; 1967 (age 58–59)
- Other name: Liz Regosin
- Occupation: Historian

Academic background
- Education: University of California, Berkeley; University of California, Irvine
- Thesis: Slave Custom and White Law: Ex-Slave Families and the Civil War Pension System, 1865-1900 (1995)
- Doctoral advisor: Michael P. Johnson

Academic work
- Discipline: African American history
- Institutions: St. Lawrence University

Elizabeth Ann Regosin (born 1967) is an American historian who is the Charles A. Dana Professor of History at St. Lawrence University. She researches African-American history with a focus on emancipation and the Reconstruction era. Regosin has written two books on the topic, Freedom's Promise (2002) and Voices of Emancipation (2008).

== Early life and education ==
Regosin was raised in Irvine, California and has 2 sisters. She earned a B.A. in history at University of California, Berkeley in 1989. She worked as a teaching assistant from 1990 to 1991 while completing a M.A. in history at University of California, Irvine in 1992. Regosin earned a Ph.D. in history at Irvine in 1995. Her dissertation was titled Slave Custom and White Law: Ex-Slave Families and the Civil War Pension System, 1865-1900. Regosin's doctoral advisor was Michael P. Johnson.

== Career ==
Regosin's main research interest is African American history with a focus on African Americans transitioning out of slavery. She has written 2 books about emancipation and the Reconstruction era. Regosin joined the faculty at St. Lawrence University in 1997 and teaches courses in U.S. history, African American history, and the history of women in the U.S. She is the Charles A. Dana Professor of History. Regosin teaches a community-based learning course with students from both St. Lawrence University and Riverview Correctional Facility.

== Selected works ==
- Regosin, Elizabeth (2002). Freedom's Promise: Ex-Slave Families and Citizenship in the Age of Emancipation. University of Virginia Press. ISBN 978-0-8139-2095-5.
- Regosin, Elizabeth A.; Shaffer, Donald R. (2008). Voices of Emancipation: Understanding Slavery, the Civil War, and Reconstruction through the U.S. Pension Bureau Files. New York University Press. ISBN 978-0-8147-7626-1.
