= White hat bias =

Type of bias in public health research

White hat bias (WHB) is a purported "bias leading to the distortion of information in the service of what may be perceived to be righteous ends", which consist of both cherry picking the evidence and publication bias. Public health researchers David Allison and Mark Cope first discussed this bias in a 2010 paper and explained the motivation behind it in terms of "righteous zeal, indignation toward certain aspects of industry", and other factors.

The term white hat refers idiomatically to an ethically good person, in this case one who has a righteous goal.

== Overview ==
This initial paper contrasted the treatment of research on the effects of nutritively-sweetened beverages and breastfeeding on obesity. They contrasted evidence which implicated these behaviors as risk and protective factors (respectively), comparing the treatment given to evidence for each conclusion. Their analyses confirmed that papers reporting null effects of soft drinks or breast-feeding on obesity were cited significantly less often than expected, and, when cited, were interpreted in ways that mislead readers about the underlying finding. Positive papers were cited more frequently than expected. For instance, of 207 citations of two papers finding no effects of sugared soft drink consumption on obesity, the majority of citations (84% and 66%) were misleadingly positive.

A meta-analysis had been reported showing that industry-funded studies reported smaller effects than did non-industry-funded studies, the implication being that industry funding leads researchers to bias their results in favor of the funder's presumed commercial interest. Allison and Cope's reanalysis of these data indicated that it was poor studies that found larger effects, and that the industry-funded studies were larger and better run: a finding consistent with a white hat bias, and suggesting that the true effect of sugar-sweetened beverages is smaller than most studies report.

Allison and Cope suggest that science might be protected better from these effects by authors and journals practicing higher standards of probity and humility in citing the literature. Young, Ioannidis and Al-Ubaydli (2008) discuss related concepts, framing scientific information and journals in the context of an economic good, with the goal being to transfer knowledge from scientists to its consumers, suggesting that acknowledging the full spectrum of effects on publication and treating addressing the effects as a moral imperative may aid this goal.

== Controversy ==
Having shown that industry studies were well run but that publication and citation bias existed against negative findings, and as predicted from a WHB effect, Allison—being funded himself by the food and beverage industry—became the subject of a media report by ABC condemning the influence of industry on diet science.

== See also ==
- Academic bias
- Replication crisis
- Cherry picking
- Consequentialism
- Funding bias
- Publication bias
- Woozle effect
