= Counternull =

In statistics, and especially in the statistical analysis of psychological data, the counternull is a statistic used to aid the understanding and presentation of research results. It revolves around the effect size, which is the mean magnitude of some effect divided by the standard deviation.

The counternull value is the effect size that is just as well supported by the data as the null hypothesis. In particular, when results are drawn from a distribution that is symmetrical about its mean, the counternull value is exactly twice the observed effect size.

The null hypothesis is a hypothesis set up to be tested against an alternative. Thus the counternull is an alternative hypothesis that, when used to replace the null hypothesis, generates the same p-value as had the original null hypothesis of “no difference.”

Some researchers contend that reporting the counternull, in addition to the p-value, serves to counter two common errors of judgment:

- assuming that failure to reject the null hypothesis at the chosen level of statistical significance means that the observed size of the "effect" is zero; and
- assuming that rejection of the null hypothesis at a particular p-value means that the measured "effect" is not only statistically significant, but also scientifically important.

These arbitrary statistical thresholds create a discontinuity, causing unnecessary confusion and artificial controversy.

Other researchers prefer confidence intervals as a means of countering these common errors.

== See also ==
- Publication bias
