= Ant mill =

Ants continuously walking in a circle

An ant mill

An ant mill is an observed phenomenon in which a group of army ants, separated from the main foraging party, lose the pheromone track and begin to follow one another, forming a continuously rotating circle. This circle is commonly known as a “death spiral” because the ants might eventually die of exhaustion. It has been reproduced in laboratories and in ant colony simulations.

The phenomenon is a side effect of the self-organizing structure of ant colonies. Each ant merely follows the ant in front of it, which functions until a slight deviation begins to occur, typically by an environmental trigger, and an ant mill forms. An ant mill was first described in 1921 by William Beebe, who observed a mill 370 meters (1,210 ft) in circumference. It took each ant two and a half hours to make one revolution. Similar phenomena have been noted in processionary caterpillars and fish.

== See also ==
- Feedback loop – Process where information about current status is used to influence future status
- Information cascade – Behavioral phenomenon
- Stigmergy – Social network mechanism of indirect coordination
- The blind leading the blind – Idiom and metaphor in the form of a parallel phrase
- Woozle effect – False credibility due to quantity of citations
