= Gelles =

- Commune
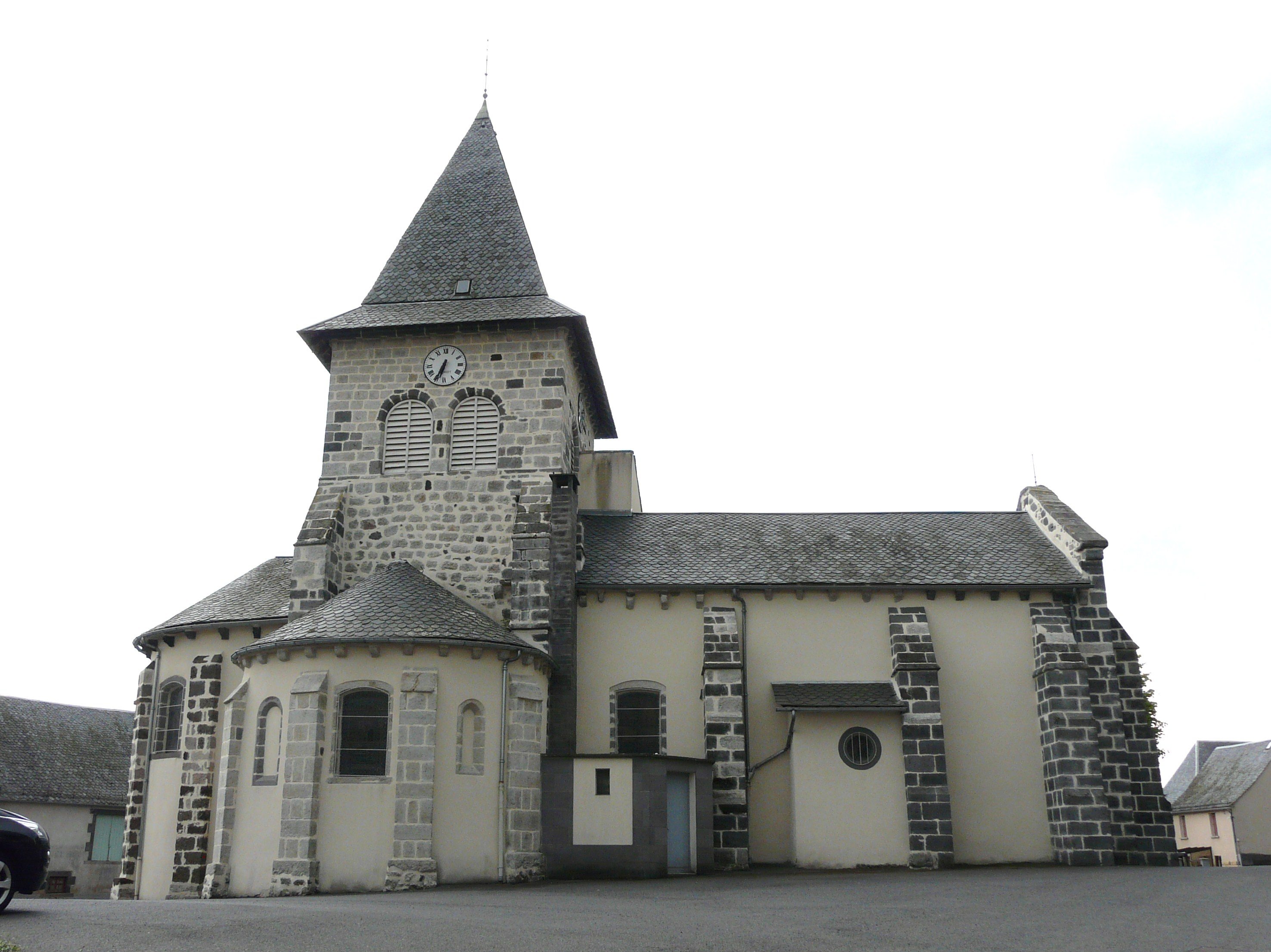
- The church in Gelles

- Coat of arms
- Location of Gelles
- Location within France Location within Auvergne-Rhône-Alpes
- Coordinates: 45°46′13″N 2°45′50″E
- Country: France
- Region: Auvergne-Rhône-Alpes
- Department: Puy-de-Dôme
- Arrondissement: Issoire
- Canton: Orcines
- Intercommunality: Dômes Sancy Artense

Government
  - Mayor (2020–2026): Luc Gourdy
- Area^{1}: 47.53 km^{2} (18.35 sq mi)
- Highest elevation: 1,044 m (3,425 ft)
- Lowest elevation: 690 m (2,260 ft)
- Population (2023): 921
  - Density: 19.4/km^{2} (50.2/sq mi)
- Time zone: UTC+01:00 (CET)
  - Summer (DST): UTC+02:00 (CEST)
- INSEE/Postal code: 63163 /63740
- ^{1} French Land Register data, which excludes lakes, ponds, glaciers > 1 km^{2} (0.386 sq mi or 247 acres) and river estuaries.

For people with the surname, see Gelles (surname).

Gelles (French pronunciation: [ʒɛl]) is a commune in the Puy-de-Dôme department in Auvergne-Rhône-Alpes in central France.

== See also ==
- Communes of the Puy-de-Dôme department
