= Conflict tactics scale =

Research scale

The conflict tactics scale (CTS), created by Murray A. Straus in 1979, is used in the research of family violence. There are two versions of the CTS; the CTS2 (an expanded and modified version of the original CTS) and the CTSPC (CTS Parent-Child). As of 2005, the CTS has been used in about 600 peer reviewed scientific or scholarly papers, including longitudinal birth-cohort studies. National surveys conducted in the USA include two National Family Violence Surveys (1975 and 1985), the National Violence Against Women Survey (1998), and the National Survey of Child and Adolescent Well-Being. A major international survey to use the CTS was the 2006 International Dating Violence Study, which investigated IPV (Intimate Partner Violence) amongst 13,601 college students across thirty-two countries.

In a 2005 article in the Journal of Interpersonal Violence, Jennifer Langhinrichsen-Rohling listed the CTS amongst the most important advances in the field of IPV research, stating it "was revolutionary because it allowed researchers to quantitatively study events that had often been ignored culturally and typically took place in private."

However, the CTS is one of the most widely criticized domestic violence measurement instruments due to its exclusion of context variables and motivational factors in understanding acts of violence. The National Institute of Justice cautions that the CTS may not be appropriate for IPV research "because it does not measure control, coercion, or the motives for conflict tactics."

== Structure ==
The scales are based on the premise that conflict is an inevitable aspect of all human association, but that the use of coercion (including force and violence) as a conflict-resolution tactic is harmful. The CTS focuses on "conflict tactics" – the method used to advance one's own interest within a conflict – as a behavior, and measures the conflict tactic behaviors of both the respondent and their partner/primary caregiver. However, the CTS "deliberately excludes attitudes, emotions, and cognitive appraisal of the behaviors" measured. This is because many victims of IPV do not see themselves as suffering abuse, and as such, their cognitive appraisal of their situation can affect the measurements of the CTS. Straus explains that the "discrepancy between the behavior and the cognitive appraisal of the behavior is important for understanding domestic violence and for designing programs of prevention and treatment. However, it is possible to identify the discrepancy only if there is an instrument such as the CTS which obtains the behavioral data."

A CTS-based study would ideally include data from respondents and their partners/primary caregivers in order to investigate the degree of symmetry or asymmetry between their responses. The CTS can be administered through an in-person interview, telephone interview, self-administered questionnaire, and/or computer-administered questionnaire.

=== Revised Conflict Tactics Scale (CTS2) ===
The revised CTS2 measures a total of 39 behaviors. Each of these behaviors, or "items", is divided into five categories: "Negotiation", "Psychological Aggression", "Physical Assault", "Sexual Coercion" and "Injury." Each of the five categories is then further subdivided into two subscales: "Negotiation" is subdivided into "Cognitive" and "Emotional", while the other four categories are subdivided into "Minor" and "Severe." There are six items in "Negotiation", eight in "Psychological Aggression," twelve in "Physical Assault," seven in "Sexual Coercion," and six in "Injury."

Examples from each category include:

- Negotiation: "I showed I cared about my partner even though we disagreed" (emotional); "Suggested a compromise to a disagreement" (cognitive).
- Psychological Aggression: "Shouted or yelled at my partner" (minor); "Threatened to hit or throw something at my partner" (severe).
- Physical Assault: "Slapped my partner" (minor); "Kicked my partner" (severe)
- Sexual Coercion: "Insisted on sex when my partner did not want to (but did not use physical force)" (minor); "Used force (like hitting, holding down, or using a weapon) to make my partner have sex" (severe)
- Injury: "Had a sprain, bruise, or small cut because of a fight with my partner" (minor); "Needed to see a doctor because of a fight with my partner, but I didn't" (severe).

CTS2 questions are presented in pairs. The first question in the pair asks respondents to indicate how often they carried out each item, in a range from "never" to "more than 20 times," in the referent period. The second asks how often the partner carried out each item within the same referent period. Default referent periods are usually 12 months, but other spans of time can be used. Subscales measuring the degree of severity of "less severe" and "more severe" behaviors are included for all CTS scales, "based on the presumed greater harm resulting from acts in the severe subscale." The severity of behaviors can also be measured by analyzing the frequency of the acts and by whether an injury was reported by the respondent.

=== CTSPC ===
The CTSPC (parent-child relationships) has scales to measure:

- physical assault (with subscales for corporal punishment and physical abuse),
- psychological aggression,
- non-violent discipline techniques.

The CTSPC also includes supplementary questions on instances of neglect, sexual abuse, and discipline in the past week.

=== Scoring ===
There are many ways to score the CTS.

Common scoring methods include:

- Prevalence: Results in the percentage of respondents who reported being a victim of or perpetrating an item (or items) one or more times.
- Frequency: Results in the number of times an item occurred in the past year. A limitation of this score is that, for general population samples, "the distribution is so skewed that the mean is not an appropriate measure of central tendency." However, a sample of known offenders or victims will have a much higher frequency score "that can be very useful for measuring the chronicity of maltreatment."
- Severity level and mutuality types: The severity level classifies each case into three categories: "none", "minor only", or "severe". The mutuality types classify each case as "respondent only", "partner only", or "both". Straus writes "the mutuality types may be particularly useful in couples therapy because over a hundred studies have found that when there is violence, 50 percent or more of the time it is by both partners."

== Criticism ==
Critics of the CTS argue it is an ineffective tool with which to measure IPV rate because, although it counts the number of acts of violence, it does not provide information about the context in which such acts occur (including the initiation, intention, history, or pattern of violence). Critics say such contexts cannot be divorced from the act itself, and therefore the CTS misrepresents the characteristics of violence between partners. Straus responds to this criticism by stating "the idea that the CTS physical assault scale is defective because it does not take into account the context, meaning, causes, and consequences of the violent acts is analogous to declaring a reading ability test invalid because it does not provide data on why a child reads poorly (such as limited exposure to books at home or test anxiety), or for not measuring the harmful effects of reading difficulty (such as low self-esteem or dropping out of school)." Michael Kimmel says of this argument, "such an analogy is utterly inadequate. It is more akin to a teacher who doesn't look at how far off the spelling mistakes are or whether there is a pattern in the mistakes that might point to a physiological problem like dyslexia or some other learning disability, as compared to academic laziness, and thus leaving the learning problems untouched and misdirecting funds away from towards punitive after-school programs for lazy students."

Another common criticism is that the CTS carries ideological assumptions about domestic violence, such as the notion that partner violence is the result of an "argument" rather than an attempt to control one's partner. Furthermore, the CTS asks about frequency only in the past twelve months and fails to detect ongoing systematic patterns of abuse. It also excludes incidents of violence that occur after separation and divorce. The CTS also does not measure economic abuse, manipulation involving children, isolation, or intimidation – all common measures of violence from a victim-advocacy perspective.

Another methodological problem is that interobserver reliability (the likelihood that the two members of the measured dyad respond similarly) is near zero for tested husband and wife couples. That is, the chances of a given couple reporting similar answers about events they both experienced is no greater than chance. On the most severe CTS items, husband-wife agreement is actually below chance: "On the item "beat up," concordance was nil: although there were respondents of both sexes who claimed to have administered beatings and respondents of both sexes who claimed to have been on the receiving end, there was not a single couple in which one party claimed to have administered and the other to have received such a beating."

== See also ==
- Child abuse
- Domestic violence against men
- Feminism and women's rights
- Masculism and men's rights
