= Judy S. Gelles =

American artist (1944–2020)

Judy S. Gelles (July 31, 1944 – March 14, 2020) was a multimedia American artist who explored the interplaybetween art, sociology, and psychology using image and text. Over a forty-year career, she worked in photography, film and video, installation, and artist’s books. Her photography is known for documenting family and domestic life, especially her own, with an ongoing witty and frank reckoning with traditional roles for women as daughter, wife, and mother. She moved beyond her own family as subject, culminating in the decade-long Fourth Grade Project, a portrait study of the lives of 300 children from around the world. Her incisive use of language overlaid on or under her images was a signature mark of her work.

== Early life ==
She was born Judith Sue Isacoff in Somersworth, New Hampshire, where she grew up. Her Jewish family was a rarity in the community. She graduated from Somersworth High at age 16. Growing up in the 1950s, she told an interviewer she had little exposure to art and culture, but was raised to focus on marriage and family. She graduated with a Bachelor in Science from Boston University in 1965 to become a teacher. She received a MEd in Counseling from the University of Miami in 1968. After marrying sociologist Richard Gelles, she had two children and was their primary caregiver in Kingston, RI.

== Career ==
Gelles did not foresee becoming an artist until 1977, when she started a diary about her life as a wife and young mother. She took a photography course at the University of Rhode Island, expecting to make "a perfect baby portrait." That soon changed. "My goal with the “Family Portrait” series was to break through the veneer of the Happy Family and the Content Mother and to expose the hidden and mundane events of family life: 5:00 AM feedings; toilet training; dirty dishes; messy rooms and messy relationships. To keep track of what was going on, I kept a daily journal.I soon began writing short autobiographical stories directly onto the photograph. These photographs were microcosmic of the Feminist reaction against the charade of the idyllic home life." The series includes portraits of her breastfeeding, being on the toilet with children hovering by, and on the floor watching television, noting she had three one-and-a-half periods a week "to do something creative."

A woman's group motivated Gelles to see herself as an artist. "I took a Sharpie pen and wrote right on the photographic paper," she said. "I was the member of a women's consciousness-raising group in the '70s and I had to decide whether I would further my career as an artist or stay as a guidance counselor and make money," she said. "The group encouraged me to go for it and become an artist." She then attended the Rhode Island School of Design, where she expanded her photographic and video craft and completed her MFA in 1991. Another key project was the Florida Family Project, 1982-2014. When she first took her family to see her parents at their Florida mobile home park, she took a group portrait. This resulted in 23 images over the years they visited, ending in the year before her mother died.

Mother Son pairs photos of herself and ones of son Jason, each from age six, to age eighteen. The triptych form, with interwoven text between the images, explores their widely contrasting experiences and self-images at each age. She explained, "Autobiographical stories display the subtly significant and significantly subtle ways we are taught to be male and female in our culture." During this time, Gelles's art photographs appeared primarily in group exhibitions. She continued themes of gender roles and family dynamics in a video. “Life Is Like a Play”, a slice of life shot in the home movie genre, is a visual diary documenting the artist's life with the insider/outsider critical eye characteristic of all her work, while also examining the world in which she lives. It examines the issue of gender difference through the eyes of three generations; her parents, her sons, her husband, and herself. In 1997, she received a Residency at the Visual Studies Workshop, and in 1998 was awarded a MacDowell Colony Fellowship.

In 1998, Judy and Richard moved to Philadelphia, where she found expanded opportunities to display her work and extend the scope of her projects. From that time, her solo shows, grants, and awards increased. Now able to look beyond her immediate home, she explored family life more symbolically. During a trip to Australia, she photographed private family sheds on Brighton Beach as reflecting both the individuality and conformity of each. She also photographed her parents' Florida Trailer Park as a series of night studies. In a similar vein, A Soldier's Story was exhibited at the National Museum of Jewish American History in 2001. The subject was her father-in-law's WWII military keepsakes that revealed a Jewish-American's perspective on memory, on military service, and on family history. She also co-directed a film with Marianne Bernstein, "From Philadelphia to the Front," focusing on six American veterans of WWII who had never talked about their years of service and recounted their confrontations with anti-Semitism as enlisted men until they talked to Gelles. Distributed worldwide in 2005, it won awards at film festivals.

During a 1905 residency at the Atlantic Center for the Arts, New Smyrna Beach, FL, Gelles created the video of "Artists on Age," which is unique for its revealing only the moving of the speakers' lips. This project led to public art. For example, in a one day residency at Love Park in Philadelphia on October 10, 2009, Gelles and Linda Brenner asked 100 people to create a fingerprint and answer the four questions. The results were printed up and displayed as part of a sculpture called "Glass House" in Philadelphia, as well as at the Pentimenti Gallery, her longtime exhibitor.

She responded to larger events into her work as well, such as portraits of urban Muslim women taken in Cairo after 9/11 and "Word Portraits" including same-sex couples in 2008, an important year in the gay marriage debate. Based upon her projects with children, she conceived of the Fourth Grade Project. For ten years Gelles interviewed and photographed over 300 fourth grade students from a range of economic and cultural backgrounds in China, Dubai, England, India, Israel, Italy, Nicaragua, St. Lucia, South Africa, South Korea, and parts of the United States. She asked three questions and took portraits of the back of each to protect their privacy. The large scale portraits integrate each child's answers as part of the text. Gelles believed this project could help expand understanding and build bridges around the world. The material developed into a curriculum project free for users under the aegis of CultureTrust Greater Philadelphia, and has an Exhibits USA touring nationally from 2020 to 2025.

== Later life ==
In addition to traveling widely to speak at screenings and exhibitions, Gelles also taught at the School of the Museum of Fine Arts in Boston, Tufts University in Boston, Boston College, University of the Arts in Philadelphia, Tyler School of Art in Philadelphia, and the International Center for Photography in New York City. Her works were accessioned by museums around the country, including Brooklyn Museum of Art, MOMA, and the Skirball Cultural Center. In 2019, she became key care taker of her husband following his brain cancer diagnosis. She kept a Caring Bridge diary to document his condition and her own state of mind. March 13, 2020 was the opening day for a group exhibit at the Pentimenti Gallery in Philadelphia. Late that evening Gelles went to the hospital with a headache, and died within hours on March 14 of a brain aneurysm. Her husband Richard Gelles died three months later.

== Significance ==
The arc of Gelles's career, from personal to community, from solitary to cooperative, reveals her continued exploration of art for social purpose and personal inquiry.. As Ann Landi reflected, "Gelles has been around long enough to have lived through the many changes that have affected the lives of women, but she approaches her subjects with warmth, humor, and consummate skill." Of her projects involving architectural structures, one gallery observed such "works take a similar taxonomic approach to understanding the politics of space, raising questions about the manner in which our quarters define, connect, and divide us."

Martin Rosenberg, chair of the Rutgers University Department of Fine Arts, calls Gelles' Florida family photos "an amazing body of work because you see the children grow up, you see the parents age, you see the grandparents age and die. She lived through the entirety of the second wave of feminism, and her work has been long caught in the nexus of feminism, motherhood, finding a career, and developing as an artist. It's all about human relationships."

Despite recognition later in her career, Gelles was aware of implicit sexist bias with regard to her emphasis on domestic life. She “felt like a lone wolf. At the time nobody wanted to show the work.” By the time of her death, her early work of her daily experience as a wife and mother became a touchstone statement for contemporary considerations of women and family.

== Art Books ==
- "When We Were Ten", 1997.
- "Beach Boxes", 2004.
- "Florida Family Portrait," 2007.
