= Michael P. Johnson =

American sociologist

- Born: Michael Paul Johnson; December 20, 1942 (age 83)

Academic background
- Education: University of Michigan
- Thesis: Power relations and processes of person perception (1974)

Academic work
- Institutions: The Pennsylvania State University
- Main interests: Domestic violence
- Notable works: A Typology of Domestic Violence: Intimate Terrorism, Violent Resistance, and Situational Couple Violence
- Notable ideas: Johnson's Typology
- Website: https://sites.psu.edu/feministmpj/welcome

Michael Paul Johnson (Ph.D., University of Michigan) is Emeritus Professor of Sociology, Women’s Studies, and African and African American Studies at Penn State, where he taught sociology and women’s studies for over thirty years and was designated an Alumni Teaching Fellow, Penn State’s highest teaching award. He is an internationally recognized expert on domestic violence, invited to speak at conferences and universities throughout the United States and around the world.

His research focuses on the implications of differentiating among types of violence in intimate relationships, and he has consulted regularly with community organizations and government agencies regarding domestic violence policy and practice. He is widely published in scholarly journals, and his major work on domestic violence is presented in A Typology of Domestic Violence: Intimate Terrorism, Violent Resistance, and Situational Couple Violence (Northeastern University Press, 2008). Although he retired from Penn State in 2005 and from consulting in 2015, he still writes occasionally when opportunity knocks.

== Education ==
Johnson obtained his BA degree in sociology from Knox College (Galesburg, Illinois) (1965), his MA in sociology from the University of Iowa (1969), and his PhD in sociology from the University of Michigan (1974).

== PAIR project ==
In 1981 a long-term study of courtship and marriage of 168 couples was implemented by Ted Huston. The project began at Penn State and was intended to last through the first two and a half years of marriage, but it was extended and extra waves of data were collected. In 1985 the project transferred to the University of Texas at Austin and a follow-up set of interviews with the participants took place in 1991. Johnson has been a collaborator on the PAIR project since its early days, with a particular interest in 'conceptions of commitment'.

== Johnson's typology ==
External videos
- Lecture by Michael P. Johnson
- Types of Domestic Violence: Research Evidence via YouTube

Johnson argues that there are four major types of intimate partner violence, a finding supported by some but rejected by others. The types of violence identified by Johnson are:

1. Situational couple violence
2. Intimate terrorism
3. Violent resistance
4. Mutual violent control: Johnson describes this as a couple who "could be viewed as two intimate terrorists battling for control".

== View on feminism ==
Johnson describes his definition of feminism as:

You're a feminist if you believe that

(1) men are privileged relative to women,
(2) that's not right, and
(3) you're going to do something about it, even if it's only in your personal life.

== Personal life ==
Johnson is retired and living in the foothills of the Appalachians with his partner Maureen; he also has two children (Jennifer and Bryan) and a grandchild (Michael).

== Selected bibliography ==
=== Book ===
- Johnson, Michael P. (2008). A typology of domestic violence: Intimate terrorism, violent resistance, and situational couple violence. Boston Hanover, New Hampshire: Northeastern University Press. ISBN 9781555536947.

=== Journal articles ===
- Johnson, Michael P. (2023). My reactions to “Johnson’s Typology of Intimate Partner Violence: Reflecting on the First 25 Years and Looking Ahead”. Journal of Family Violence. doi: 10.1007/s10896-023-00595-7.
- Nawaz, Bela and Michael P. Johnson. (May, 2022). Types of domestic violence in Pakistan: Elaborating on Johnson’s typology. Journal of Family Violence (doi: 10.1007/s10896-022- 00420-7.
- Johnson, Michael P. (2017). A personal social history of a typology of intimate partner violence. Journal of Family Theory & Review 9 (June), 150–164. DOI:10.1111/jftr.12187.
- Hardesty, Jennifer L., Kimberly A. Crossman, Megan L. Haselschwerdt, Marcela Raffaelli, Brian G. Ogolsky, and Michael P. Johnson. (2015). Toward a standard approach to operationalizing coercive control and classifying violence types. Journal of Marriage and Family 77 (August), 833-843.
- Johnson, Michael P., Janel M. Leone, & Yili Xu. (2014) Intimate terrorism and situational couple violence in general surveys: Ex-spouses required. Violence Against Women 20 (February), 186-207.
- Johnson, Michael P. (2011). Gender and types of intimate partner violence: A response to an anti-feminist literature review. Aggression and Violent Behavior 16 (July/August), 289-296.
