= Violence and Victims =

- Discipline: interpersonal violence, victimization
- Language: English
- Edited by: Roland D. Maiuro

Publication details
- History: 1986–present
- Publisher: Springer Publishing (United States)
- Frequency: Bimonthly
- Impact factor: 0.858 (2014)

Standard abbreviations
- ISO 4: Violence Vict.

Indexing
- ISSN: 0886-6708 (print); 1945-7073 (web)
- LCCN: 86658044
- OCLC no.: 7938261

Links
- Journal homepage

Violence and Victims is a bimonthly peer-reviewed academic journal covering theory, research, policy, and clinical practice in the area of interpersonal violence and victimization, touching diverse disciplines such as psychology, sociology, criminology, law, medicine, nursing, psychiatry, and social work.

The journal's scope includes original research on violence-related victimization within, and outside of, the family; the etiology and perpetration of violent behavior; health care research related to interpersonal violence and to trauma; legal issues; and implications for clinical interventions. Occasionally, there are special issues dealing with specific topics and relevant books are often reviewed. Violence and Victims is published by Springer Publishing Company.

== Abstracting and indexing ==
Violence and Victims is indexed or abstracted in PsycINFO, PsycLIT, Family and Society Studies Worldwide, EMBASE, Sociological Abstracts, Social Services and Social Work Abstracts, Violence and Abuse Abstracts, National Criminal Justice Reference Service, Index Medicus, MEDLINE, PILOTS Database, PubMed, Psychological Abstracts, Criminal Justice Abstracts, and Educational Administration Abstracts. According to the Journal Citation Reports, the journal has a 2016 impact factor of 0.750.
