= Murray A. Straus =

American professor of sociology (1926–2016)

- Born: Murray Arnold Straus; June 18, 1926; New York City
- Died: May 13, 2016 (aged 89)
- Education: University of Wisconsin (B.A., M.S., Ph.D.)
- Known for: Conflict Tactics Scale
- Spouse: Dorothy Dunn Straus
- Children: 2
- Scientific career
- Workplaces: University of New Hampshire
- Academic advisors: William H. Sewell
- Doctoral students: David Finkelhor
- Website: pubpages.unh.edu/~mas2

Murray Arnold Straus (June 18, 1926 – May 13, 2016) was an American professor of sociology at the University of New Hampshire. He is best known for creating the conflict tactics scale, the "most widely used instrument in research on family violence".

== Professional life ==
Straus was born to Samuel and Kathleen Straus in New York City on June 18, 1926. Straus' research focused on families, corporal punishment, and intimate partner violence with an emphasis on cross-national comparisons. He founded the Family Research Laboratory at the University of New Hampshire. Straus served as president of the Society for the Study of Social Problems (1989–90) and the Eastern Sociological Society (1991–92). He was also a founding editor of the peer-review academic journals Teaching Sociology and Journal of Family Issues.

== Personal life ==
He was married to Dorothy Dunn Straus and had a son and a daughter from a previous marriage.

== Achievements and awards ==
- Award for Distinguished Lifetime Contributions to Research on Aggression – 2008
- Ernest W. Burgess Award – 1977
