= Psychology of Violence =

- Discipline: Psychology
- Language: English
- Edited by: Antonia Abbey

Publication details
- History: 2010-present
- Publisher: American Psychological Association (United States)
- Frequency: Quarterly
- Impact factor: 4.147 (2020)

Standard abbreviations
- ISO 4: Psychol. Violence

Indexing
- ISSN: 2152-0828 (print); 2152-081X (web)
- LCCN: 2009208054
- OCLC no.: 469106680

Links
- Journal homepage; Online access

Psychology of Violence is a peer-reviewed academic journal published by the American Psychological Association. It was established in 2010 with Sherry Hamby (University of the South) as founding editor-in-chief, and covers research on "identifying the causes of violence from a psychological framework, finding ways to prevent or reduce violence, and developing practical interventions and treatments". The current editor-in-chief is Antonia Abbey (Wayne State University).

== Abstracting and indexing ==
The journal is abstracted and indexed by the Social Sciences Citation Index and SCOPUS. According to the Journal Citation Reports, the journal has a 2020 impact factor of 4.147.
