= Philip W. Cook =

American journalist

Philip W. Cook is an American journalist. He is the author of Abused Men – The Hidden Side of Domestic Violence, as well as the co-author, with Tammy L. Hodo, of When Women Sexually Abuse Men: The Hidden Side of Rape, Stalking, Harassment, and Sexual Assault.

== Education ==
He obtained his degree in journalism from the University of Oregon.

== Career ==
Cook focuses his work on domestic violence and family programs. He examines the results of research, the feelings and problems of victims, and the response of the media on the issue. He has been the director of radio stations in Texas and Oregon as well as director of television news stations in Washington and Nevada.

Cook left journalism for a year and became a stay at home dad for his one child. He later returned to work where he was the program director and eventually executive director of PACE Institute For Families in Transition. Here, Cook along with many others, created classes called "Children for Divorce". The class required all divorcing and separating parents with children to attend and taught the parents how to not involve the children in the conflicts, diffuse anger, and improve the children's self-esteem. The classes are now mandatory, for parents divorcing or splitting up, in one-third of Oregon counties.

== Awards and honors ==
Cook has received a number of awards for his reporting from the Associated Press and the Professional Journalism Society. The Radio Television News Directors Association also recognized him as a national scholarship recipient.

== Appearances ==
Cook has appeared on a variety of different national television and radio shows which include: MSNBC, Fox TV's "The Crier Report", "The Sally Jesse Raphael Show", "The Home and Family Show", Westwood Radio Network (Jim Bohannon Show, Dirk Van), and CBS radio. His domestic violence articles have been published in The Employee Assistance Professional "Exchange" Magazine, The Oregonian, Women's Freedom Network Magazine, and many others.
