= Richard Gelles =

American writer and sociologist (1946–2020)

Richard James Gelles (July 7, 1946 – June 26, 2020) was an American writer and sociologist. His research on family violence and child welfare helped shape government policy and social work practices nationwide.

== Education ==
Gelles received a B.A. from Bates College in Maine in 1968. In 1970, he graduated with a M.A. in sociology from the University of Rochester, and received a Ph.D. in sociology from the University of New Hampshire in 1973.

== Career ==
Gelles joined the faculty of the University of Rhode Island in 1971. There he started his research on domestic violence. His study, The Violent Home, was the first systematic investigation to provide empirical data on domestic violence. Though originally a supporter of keeping families intact, his research leading to The Book of David: How Preserving Families Can Cost Children's Lives forced a change in his position. He discovered 2000 children died annually as a result of family violence, even when under the aegis of social welfare. He also used his research to become an advocate for changes in social welfare legislation. During a sabbatical year, he worked as a congressional fellow on the House Ways and Means Committee. His contributions led to the passage of the Adoption and Safe Families Act of 1997. That act included a provision known as the 15/22 rule. If a child had been in foster care for 15 of the previous 22 months, states were required to terminate the biological parents’ rights so that the child could be put up for adoption. As a result, more foster children found adoptive homes.

In 1998 he became Professor of Social Policy at the University of Pennsylvania and held the Joanne and Raymond Welsh Chair of Child Welfare and Family Violence in the School of Social Policy & Practice. He was made interim dean of the School of Social Work. He was also director of the Center for Research on Youth & Social Policy and co-director of the Field Center for Children's Policy Practice & Research at the University of Pennsylvania.

His Intimate Violence in Families, Third Edition, similarly made a significant impact in the study of child welfare and family violence. Gelles also co-wrote Current Controversies on Family Violence (2005) with M. Cavanaugh and D. Loseke. He co-wrote another key text, Intimate Violence and Abuse in Families. He was eventually the author of 24 books and more than 100 articles, chapters and papers. He also continued to be an advocate, appearing on TV and radio, as well as testifying to political bodies.

Gelles responded forthrightly to prevent the public from purposefully distorting his research findings on family life. For example, in response to father's rights groups, Gelles published "Domestic Violence: Not An Even Playing Field" to rectify what he calls a "significant distortion of well-grounded research data.

== Private life ==
Gelles married Judy S. Isacoff, who later became a visionary photographer of domestic life. They had two sons, David and Jason. A lifelong baseball fan and supporter of the Red Sox, he served on the board of directors for the nonprofit organization Pitch in for Baseball. Gelles's mother Evelyn was such a fan that she asked her ashes be left in the Boston Fenway Park field. Richard and son Jason did so.

He died of brain cancer on June 26, 2020, three months after the unexpected death of his wife. On visits to see his dying father, Jason noticed a small bag labelled “Fenway dirt.” It was a gift package colleagues gave Gelles when he stepped down from a deanship at Penn. At the burial, Jason tossed the Fenway grit into his father's grave, an act baseball fans especially understand.
