= Anya Samek =

American economist

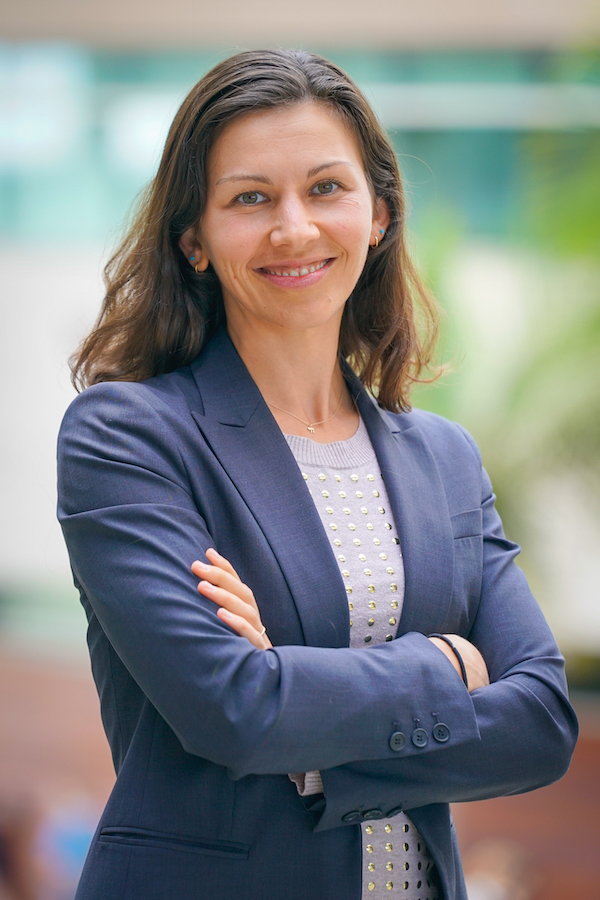
- Born: Chernivtsi, Ukrainian SSR, Soviet Union (now Ukraine)

Academic background
- Education: Purdue University

Academic work
- Discipline: Behavioral Economics; Applied Economics; Experimental Economics; Strategy
- Institutions: University of California, San Diego; National Bureau of Economic Research; Norwegian School of Economics
- Website: anyasamek.com

Anya Samek is an American economist who works in the fields of applied economics, behavioral economics, experimental economics, and strategy. She is currently an associate professor of economics at the Rady School of Management at the University of California, San Diego.

== Career ==
Samek graduated from Purdue University in 2005 with her B.A. in economics summa cum laude, and then went on to receive her M.S. in economics in 2006 from the Krannert School of Management, Purdue University. She received her PhD in economics from Purdue University in 2010. In April 2010, she was invited by the University of Chicago to be a postdoctoral research scholar. In 2014 she continued her work for the University of Chicago as a visiting assistant professor. After three years as an assistant professor at the University of Wisconsin Madison, Samek became an Associate Professor (Research) of Economics at the University of Southern California (USC) with a joint appointment at the Center for Economic and Social Research (CESR) and the Department of Economics.

In 2020, she joined the Rady School of Management at the University of California, San Diego as an associate professor of economics. She is a Faculty Research Fellow at the National Bureau of Economic Research (NBER) and an affiliate of the FAIR Centre at the Norwegian School of Economics Norwegian School of Economics. She is also the director of the Behavioral and Experimental Economics (BEE) Research Group.

She was the 2020 recipient of the Vernon L. Smith Ascending Scholar Prize.

== Work ==
Samek's work on various economics topics, including charitable giving, education, and health, includes over 100 academic publications.

=== Charitable giving ===
Samek's work in charitable giving, among other topics, looks at what affects the decisions of donors in the act of giving.

==== Social pressure effect ====
Samek and Chuan explored how the manipulation of allowing a donor to give a card along with their donation, an act meant to add meaning to the transaction, affects their giving rates. It was discovered that this manipulation caused a social pressure effect as "small donors feel that they should be donating more" and thus refrains them from donating all together.

==== Selective recognition ====
In 2013, Samek and Sheremeta investigated how the act of recognizing donors affects the extent of contributions to public goods. They found that recognizing all or solely the lowest donors significantly increases contributions, while recognizing the highest donors has no effect on the extent of contribution at all. It was concluded from the study that "aversion from shame" is more powerful than "anticipation of prestige".

=== Education ===
Among other papers, Samek's work analyzes how different modes of education can effect early childhood learning and adult financial decision-making.

==== Improving financial literacy ====
Samek, along with Lusardi, Kapteyn, Glinert, Hung, and Heinberg, evaluated different mediums of educational programs aimed at to educate adults about risk diversification. The work cites risk diversification as an "essential concept for financial decision-making". Their research found that videos are the most effective means of communicating financial literacy, which highlighted the power of online media in educating and altering the decisions of recipients.

==== Academic achievement gap ====
In 2012, Samek helped launch a large-scale project called the Chicago Heights Early Childhood Center (CHECC). Samek and a team of scholars sought to understand the academic achievement gap and how early childhood education interventions may reduce it. The research found that preschool programs and incentives to parents lead to large reductions in the academic achievement gap.

Samek said this about her work at CHECC:

The CHECC results not only allow us to provide quality early childhood education but also help inform us about how to most effectively develop early childhood programs. We are excited to move forward as we continue to provide the Chicago Heights community quality early childhood programming.

=== Health ===
Samek's work on health includes examination of the effects of interventions in the decision-making of children in regards to food choice.

==== Prompts ====
Over several weeks, Samek, List, and Lai ran an experiment aimed at better understanding how prompts affect the food-choice of children. They discovered that when nudges by cafeteria workers are applied, children are more likely to opt for white milk relative to sugar-sweetened chocolate milk.

==== Individual incentives and educational messaging ====
Samek and List analyzed how individual incentives and educational messaging affect the food choice of children. They discovered that when the two interventions were applied in tandem, they held an important influence in increasing the rate at which children opt for healthier snacks. Notably, the research showed that the effects of the experiment continued to spill over after its completion, suggesting that individual incentives and education messaging encourages habit-building among children.

== Selected bibliography ==
=== Recent publications ===
- Dynamic Inconsistency in Food Choice: Evidence from a Food Desert, with Charlie Sprenger and Sally Sadoff, Review of Economic Studies.
- The Effect of Early Education on Social Preferences, with Alexander Cappelen, Bertil Tungodden, and John List, Journal of Political Economy.
- The Effect of Recipient Contribution Requirements on Support for Social Programs, with Sally Sadoff, Journal of Public Economics.
- Gender Differences in Job Entry Decisions: A university-Wide Field Experiment, Management Science.
- Toward an understanding of the development of time preferences: Evidence from field experiments, with Jim Andreoni, John List, Michael Kuhn, Kevin Sokal and Charles Sprenger, Journal of Public Economics.
- Do Thank-You Calls Increase Charitable Giving? Expert Forecasts and Field Experimental Evidence, with Chuck Longfield, Working Paper.

=== Financial technology publications ===
- Learning through Passive Participation in Asset Market Bubbles, with Timothy Cason, Journal of the Economic Science Association, 2015, Vol 1:2, pp 170–181.
- Using Online Compound Interest Tools to Improve Financial Literacy, with Percival Matthews and Edward Hubbard, Journal of Economic Education, 2016, 47(2), pp 106–120.
- An Experimental Study of the Decision Process with Interactive Technology, with Ji Soo Yi, Sung-Hee Kim and Inkyoung Hur, Journal of Economic Behavior & Organization, 2016, Vol. 130, pp 20–32.
- Visual Tools and Narratives: New Ways to Improve Financial Literacy, with Annamaria Lusardi, Arie Kapteyn, Angela Hung, Lewis Glinert and Aileen Heinberg, Journal of Pension Economics and Finance, 2015, pp 1–27.
- Effects of Monitoring on Mortgage Delinquency: Evidence from a Randomized Field Study, with Stephanie Moulton, Michael Collins and Cäzilia Loibl, Journal of Policy Analysis and Management, 2014, Vol 34:1, pp 184–207.

=== Personal finance publications ===
- "The Effect of Informational Prompts about Spousal Benefits on Social Security Claim Intentions", with Joanne Yoong, Lilia Rabinovich and Francisco Perez-Arce. Journal of Pension Economics and Finance, forthcoming.
- 'No Regrets': Qualitative Evidence on Early Claiming of Social Security, with Lila Rabinovich. Journal of Aging Studies, 2018, Vol 46, pp 17–23.
- Physical and Mental Health Correlates of Perceived Financial Exploitation in Older Adults: Preliminary Findings from the Finance, Cognition, and Health in Elders Study (FINCHES), with Gali H. Weissberger, Laura Mosqueda, Annie L. Nguyen, Patricia A. Boyle, Caroline P. Nguyen and S. Duke Han, Aging and Mental Health, 2019.
- Five Steps to Planning Financial Success: Experimental Evidence from U.S. Households, with Annamaria Lusardi, Arie Kapteyn, Angela Hung, Joanne Yoong and Aileen Heinberg, Oxford Review of Economic Policy, 2014, Vol 30:4, pp 696–724.
- Borrowing Capacity and Financial Decisions of Low-to-Moderate Income First-Time Home- buyers, with Stephanie Moulton, Cäzilia Loibl and Michael Collins, Journal of Consumer Affairs, 2013, Vol 47:3, pp 375–403.

== Awards ==
- Vernon L. Smith Ascending Scholar Prize, 2022.
- Faculty Fellow, Teaching and Learning Excellence Initiative, UW-Madison, 2013–14.
- Award for Outstanding Teaching, Krannert School of Management, Purdue University, 2008.
- David M. Knox Fellowship, Purdue University, 2005.

== See also ==
- Women in economics
