= Ernan Haruvy =

American economist and academic

- Born: September 21, 1974 (age 52); Haifa, Israel

Academic background
- Education: University of Texas at Austin

Ernan Haruvy is an American economist, professor of business, and author He is currently a professor at McGill University. He is an Associate Editor at Management Science (journal).

== Career ==
In 1993, Haruvy was a research assistant for Professors Yoav Kislev at the Hebrew University of Jerusalem Faculty of Agriculture in Rehovot, where he worked on the economic impact of Continuing Son Law in the Moshav.

In 1999, Haruvy obtained a doctorate in economics from the University of Texas at Austin under the supervision of Dale Stahl, with concentrations in game theory and econometrics, and specialties in behavioral economics and experimental economics.

In 1999, he joined the Technion – Israel Institute of Technology, where he was trained by Professor Ido Erev on learning theory. During that time, Haruvy also worked with Uri Gneezy in pioneering applications of Field experiment.

In 2000, he joined Harvard Business School. He completed his post-doctoral work at Harvard University under Nobel laureate Alvin Roth, where he worked on applying behavioral economics insights to Market design. He was subsequently hired as a professor at the University of Texas at Dallas, where he was mentored by Frank Bass.

== Research works ==
Haruvy's research has been focused on improving the fundraising performance of charitable organizations and cultural institutions, as well as channeling investment dollars to sustainable endeavors. and improving corporate governance

== Awards and recognition ==
- Management Science Distinguished Service Award for 2009, 2010, and 2021
- SSHRC Insights Grant 2020, awarded by Social Science and Humanities Research Council of Canada
- SSHRC Insights Grant 2022, awarded by Social Science and Humanities Research Council of Canada
- Service Award by the University of Texas at Dallas
- Awarded the second 'Donna Wilhelm Research Fellow' at SMU's National Center for Arts Research (NCAR).

== Media Appearances ==
Haruvy has given a number of interviews in media outlets, on various topics including the cost of college tuition, crypto currencies, co-branding, social media, social preferences, and pricing.
