= John List (disambiguation) =

John List may refer to:

- John A. List (born 1968), American economist
- John List (1925–2008), American mass murderer
