= The Why Axis =

2013 book by John A. List and Uri Gneezy

The Why Axis: Hidden Motives and the Undiscovered Economics of Everyday Life (ISBN 978-1-61039-8374) is a 2013 book by economists John A. List and Uri Gneezy. The book explores the underlying motivations behind common human behavior, using economics to uncover the reason behind our everyday decisions. This book aims to use experimental economics in order to answer common questions in everyday life.
