= List of Sigma Phi Epsilon members =

Sigma Phi Epsilon is an American social college fraternity. It was founded at Richmond College, which is now the University of Richmond, in 1901. Following are some of the fraternity's notable members.

== Academia ==
Name	Original chapter	Notability	Ref.
Kenneth Arrow	City College of New York	Nobel Laureate in Economics; professor	
Ronald Carrier	East Tennessee State University	James Madison University President Emeritus	
John Kotter	MIT	Professor, Harvard Business School	
Frank Speck		Anthropologist and professor at the University of Pennsylvania	

== Art ==
Name / Original chapter / Notability / Ref.; Romero Britto / University of Miami / Brazilian neo-pop artist

== Business ==
Name	Original chapter	Notability	Ref.
Christian Claudio		Puerto Rican athlete, healthcare consultant	
James L. Clayton	University of Tennessee	Founder and retired CEO, Clayton Homes	
Kenneth T. Derr	Cornell University	Chairman, Chevron Oil	
Richard DeVos	Grand Valley State University	President and co-founder, Amway Corporation	
Brandon Ebel		Owner of Tooth and Nail, Solid State and BEC record companies	
Bob Hartsook	Emporia State University	Founder and chairman, HARTSOOK	
Jeffrey O. Henley	University of California, Santa Barbara	Chairman, Oracle Corporation	
Steven Hicks	University of Texas at Austin	Principal owner, Capstar Partners LLC	
Tom Hicks	University of Texas at Austin	Leveraged buyout billionaire	
Terry J. Lundgren	University of Arizona	President and CEO, Federated Department Stores	
Jim McKelvey	Washington University in St. Louis	Billionaire entrepreneur and co-founder, Block Inc.	
Alexander Muse		President and CEO, Architel	
Kent C. "Oz" Nelson	Ball State University	Retired chairman and CEO, United Parcel Service	
Michael Pocalyko		CEO of Monticello Capital, financial novelist	
Harold A. Poling	Monmouth College	Retired chairman and CEO, Ford Motor Company	
William Schreyer	Pennsylvania State University	Retired chairman and CEO, Merrill Lynch & Co.	
Robert Stempel		Retired chairman and CEO, General Motors Corporation	
R. David "Dave" Thomas	Renaissance Brother, Duke University	Founder and former CEO, Wendy's	
Fred L. Turner	Drake University	Chairman, McDonald's Corporation	

== Entertainment ==
Name	Original chapter	Notability	Ref.
Joe Don Baker	NTSU / University of North Texas	Actor	
John Bell	University of Georgia	Musician, founding member of Widespread Panic	
Marc Blucas	Wake Forest University	Actor	
Allen Covert	New York University	Comedian, actor, writer	
Andy Fickman	Texas Tech University	Director	
John Goodman	Southwest Missouri State University	Actor	
Kevin Gray	Duke University	Actor	
Adam Gregory	Northern Kentucky University	Actor	
David Harbour	Dartmouth College	Actor, Stranger Things	
Steve Hofstetter	Columbia University	Comedian, radio personality	
Tom Llamas	Loyola University New Orleans	Reporter/anchor	
Mark Long	University of Florida	MTV personality/host	
John Lutz	Valparaiso University	Writer, Saturday Night Live; actor, 30 Rock	
James McDaniel	University of Pennsylvania	Actor, NYPD Blue	
Hal Needham		Stuntman and director	
Carroll O'Connor	University of Montana	Actor	
Mike O'Meara	American University	Radio personality	
Danny Pino	Florida International University	Actor	
Walter Plunkett	University of California, Berkeley	Academy Award-winning costume designer	
Glen Powell	University of Texas at Austin	Actor	
Lucas Prata	University of Miami	Dance musician	
Mike Rich	Oregon State University	Screenwriter, best known for Finding Forrester and Secretariat	
Andy Richter	University of Illinois	Actor, co-host of Late Night with Conan O'Brien	
Travis Rush		Country musician	
Andrew Wantuck	Arizona State University	Producer, Golf Channel, Comedy Central	

== Government and politics ==
Name	Original chapter	Notability	Ref.
Sam Arora	Columbia University	Maryland state delegate, Montgomery County, Maryland	
Steve Bartlett	Renaissance Brother, University of Texas at Austin	Former U.S. congressman, mayor of Dallas	
Ronald H. Brown		Former U.S. Secretary of Commerce	
Harvey Locke Carey		U. S. Attorney for the Western District of Louisiana, 1950-1952	
Ward Connerly		Civil rights activist, regent of the University of California	
John E. Douglas		Former chief, FBI Investigative Support Unit	
Brian Dubie		Lt. governor of Vermont	
John Engler (honorary member)	Michigan State University	Governor of Michigan	
Lowe Finney	University of Tennessee-Martin	Tennessee state senator, Gibson County, Carroll County, Madison County	
Vito John Fossella, Jr.	University of Pennsylvania	U.S. congressman, Staten Island and Brooklyn, New York, 1997—2009	
Jim Justice	Marshall University	Governor of West Virginia	
John Arthur Love	University of Denver	Governor of Colorado	
Scott McClellan	University of Texas at Austin	White House Press Secretary, 2003–2006	
Roy R. Romer	Colorado State University	Governor of Colorado	
Daniel H. Sparks	University of Mississippi	State senator of Mississippi	
Cecil H. Underwood		Governor of West Virginia	
Alexander Wiley		Senator of Wisconsin 1939-1963	

== Literature ==
Name	Original chapter	Notability	Ref.
Robert Bartley	Iowa State University	Editor, The Wall Street Journal	
Bob Broeg	University of Missouri	Hall of Fame baseball journalist/writer for the St. Louis Cardinals	
Chris DeRose	Northern Illinois University	New York Times bestselling author	
Brady Hicks	La Salle University	Wrestling journalist and Pro Wrestling Illustrated contributing writer	
Dr. Seuss (Theodor Geisel)	Dartmouth College	Children's author	

== Military ==
Name	Original chapter	Notability	Ref.
Ronald H. Brown	VT Beta	Captain, United States Army	
Justice M. Chambers	DC Alpha	First SigEp known to be presented the Medal of Honor; World War II veteran of Tulagi, Saipan, Tinian & Iwo Jima; colonel, United States Marine Corps (retired)	
James T. Conway	MO Zeta	General, United States Marine Corps, Commandant of the Marine Corps	
Brian Dubie	VT Gamma	Colonel, U.S. Air Force Reserve (retired)	
Duane Francies		First lieutenant	
William A. Jones III	VA Eta	Second SigEp Medal of Honor recipient; Vietnam War veteran; colonel, United States Air Force	
Iven Carl Kincheloe, Jr.	IN Alpha	Captain, United States Air Force, Korean War ace and the first to fly above 100,000 feet and Mach 3; nicknamed "America's No. 1 Spaceman"	
Anthony "Nuts" McAuliffe	WV Beta	General, United States Army	
James Meissner	NY Beta	World War I veteran and fighter ace; major, United States Air Service; second SigEp awarded Army Distinguished Service Cross twice; founder, Alabama Air National Guard	
David McKelvey Peterson	PA Epsilon	World War I veteran and fighter ace; major, United States Air Service; also Lafayette Escadrille, French Air Service pilot; first & 1 of 2 SigEps awarded Army Distinguished Service Cross twice	
Kiffin Rockwell	VA Epsilon	U.S. Naval Academy Midshipman for less than one year; first documented American to score a victory in aerial combat; Lafayette Escadrille, French Air Service pilot	
Admiral Elmo R. Zumwalt, Jr.	CT Alpha Renaissance	Former Chief of Naval Operations; member of Joint Chiefs of Staff	

== Religion ==
Name / Original chapter / Notability / Ref.; Rabbi Arnold Resnicoff / / Navy chaplain, National Director of Interreligious Affairs (American Jewish Committee), and Special Assistant (for Values and Vision) to the Chief of Staff and Secretary of the United States Air Force

== Science and medicine ==
Name	Original chapter	Notability	Ref.
Karol Bobko		Space Shuttle Commander, NASA	
Douglas C. Engelbart		Inventor of the computer mouse	
Drew Feustel		NASA astronaut; Purdue University	
Brian Werner		Tiger conservationist	

== Sports ==
Name	Original chapter	Notability	Ref.
Kenny Albert	New York University	Sportscaster	
Bill Brown		Professional football player; Pro Bowl running back, Minnesota Vikings	
Brandon Brown	Coastal Carolina University	NASCAR driver	
Hubert A. Caldwell		Olympic crew, 1928 gold medalist	
Sean Casey	University of Richmond	Professional baseball player; first baseman, Boston Red Sox	
Chris Chike		eSports competitor; former #1 ranked Guitar Hero player in the world; 2017 DanceDanceRevolution world champion and current #2 ranked player in the world	
Bill Cubit		Head football coach, Western Michigan University	
Bill Doba		Former head football coach, Washington State University	
John Fina		Professional football player; tackle, Buffalo Bills	
Richard J. Gannon	University of Delaware	Professional football player; quarterback, Oakland Raiders, NFL MVP 2002	
Orel Hershiser	Bowling Green State University	Professional baseball player; pitcher, Los Angeles Dodgers, Cy Young Award Winner, 1988, World Series Champion	
Tom Hicks	University of Texas at Austin	Former owner of the Dallas Stars, Liverpool F.C. and Texas Rangers	
Bobby Hurley	Duke University	Former NBA player, NCAA coach	
Nate Hybl	University of Oklahoma	Quarterback, 2002 Rose Bowl MVP	
James Johnson		Professional basketball player; Miami Heat	
Gene Keady		Former head coach, Purdue University Men's Basketball	
Don Laz		Olympic pole vaulter, 1952 Summer Olympics	
Bob Lilly	Texas Christian University	Professional football player; Pro Football Hall of Fame defensive tackle, Dallas Cowboys	
Emil Liston		Former head coach, Baker University, Michigan Technological University	
Dallas Long		Olympic shot putter, 1960 silver medalist, 1964 gold medalist	
Ryan Mathews	Fresno State University	Running back, San Diego Chargers, formerly of California State University at Fresno, NCAA Football Leading Rusher of 2009	
John Matuszak	University of Tampa	NFL Hall of Famer; 1st overall pick in the 1973 NFL Draft of the Houston Oilers; played with the Oakland Raiders for the majority of his career; led the Raiders to two Super Bowl Championships (XI & XV)	
Keith Moreland		Professional baseball player; outfielder, Chicago Cubs	
James Naismith		Inventor of the sport of basketball	
Davey O'Brien	Texas Christian University	Heisman Trophy-winning quarterback, 1938	
Victor Ortiz		Professional boxer and former WBC Champion, University of Kansas	
Shawn Powell	Florida State University	NFL punter, Buffalo Bills	
Jalen Ramsey	Florida State University	NFL cornerback, Los Angeles Rams	
Jon Rauch		Professional baseball player; pitcher, Morehead State University	
Dean Refram		Professional golfer, Florida Southern College	
Alma Richards		Olympic high jumper, 1912 gold medalist	
Roy Riegels		Member of the Rose Bowl Hall of Fame, famed for 1929 Rose Bowl where he was dubbed "Wrong Way"	
Johnny Robinson		Professional football player; strong safety, Kansas City Chiefs, All-Time All-AFL Team	
Sandy Sandberg	Iowa Wesleyan University	Professional football player	
John Smith	Oklahoma State University	Olympic wrestling champion, freestyle	
J. C. Snead	East Tennessee State University	Professional golfer	
Jonnie Stewart	University of Memphis	AWA professional wrestler; unsuccessfully ran for U.S. representative in Illinois in 1999 and Illinois governor in 2018	
Bob Todd		Ohio State University baseball coach	
Ron Zook	Miami University	Former head football coach, University of Illinois and University of Florida	
