= Ayelet Gneezy =

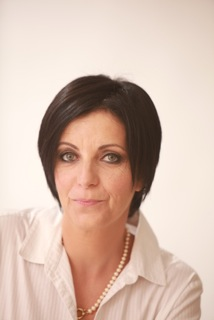
- Born: August 25, 1966 (age 60); Uganda, Africa

Academic background
- Education: University of Chicago; University of Teesside

Academic work
- Discipline: Consumer goods Services; Non-profit
- Institutions: University of California, San Diego

Ayelet Gneezy (born August 25, 1966) is an associate professor of marketing at the Rady School of Management, UC San Diego.

== Education and career ==
Gneezy obtained her MBA at the University of Teesside joint with The Hague University of Applied Sciences. She went on to manage the strategic planning department in DataPro Proximity (a subsidiary of BBDO) in Israel, before receiving her PhD in marketing at the University of Chicago Graduate School of Business in 2007.

Gneezy teaches marketing communications, social entrepreneurship and consumer behavior to MBA students at the University of California, San Diego.

== Research ==
Gneezy's research addresses various questions regarding consumer behavior, including social preferences, prosocial behavior, behavioral pricing, and factors influencing quality of life for individuals. She collaborates with both small and large firms and integrates field experiments in order to answer this questions.

In a 2010 study, Gneezy and coauthors worked with Disney Research to study a behavioral pricing approach called pay-what-you-want at an amusement park. In a large-scale field experiment, they sold people souvenir photos from a ride at the park under four conditions. In the first of these, the photos were priced at the regular $12.95; about 0.5% (1 in 200) of people bought a photo in this condition. In the second condition, the price stayed the same but consumers were told that half of the proceeds would go to charity, which resulted in about 0.57% of people buying the photos. The third condition allowed people to pay what they want for the photos, which resulted in 16 times more sales, but at prices so low that they were unsustainable. In the final condition, Gneezy and her coauthors offered the consumers the option to pay what they want and told them half of the proceeds would go to charity. The results of the final condition were astonishing; the amusement park profited significantly from this condition, along with a considerable amount of money being raised for the charity. This demonstrated what Gneezy and her colleagues refer to as "shared social responsibility" – the idea that involving the consumer in the pricing of goods and the choice of contributions increases the benefit to both the consumers and the company. In a follow-up experiment, passengers on a boat ride were offered the chance to buy photos at a high price ($15), a low price ($5), or to choose their own price. Demand rose when the price was decreased, but fell again when passengers were allowed to choose their own price.

The results of this study received widespread media attention and have inspired many more studies and experiments. Gneezy and coauthors are credited for playing a major role as pioneers in pay-what-you-want research. They won the 2011 Society for Personality and Social Psychology Robert B. Cialdini Award for excellence in a published field study. This award includes a $2,400 cash prize.

In more recent work she has investigated the distracting effect of smart phones and tracked people's responses to three types of promises: broken ones, kept ones, and then ones that were fulfilled beyond expectations, finding that the small positive effect of overdelivering is far outweighed by the large negative effect of underdelivering.

== Personal life ==
Gneezy lives with her husband Uri Gneezy, and three children in San Diego, California.

== Academic publications ==
- Baca-Motes, K., Brown, A., Gneezy, A. Keenan, E. and Nelson, L. D. (2013). Commitment and behavior change: Evidence from the field. Journal of Consumer Research, 39, 1070–84.
- Gneezy, A., Gneezy, U., Riener, G., & Nelson, L. D. (2012). Pay-What-You-Want, Identity, and Self-Signaling, Proceedings of the National Academy of Sciences, 109(19): 7236–40.
- Gneezy, A., Imas, A., Nelson, L. D., Brown, A., and Norton, M. I. (2012). Paying to be Nice: Costly Prosocial Behavior and Consistency, Management Science, 58:179–87.
- Gneezy, A. and Fessler D.T. (2011). Conflict, sticks and carrots: war increases prosocial punishments and rewards . Proceedings of the Royal Society B., published online before print June 8, 2011, doi:10.1098/rspb.2011.0805
- Gneezy, A., Gneezy, U., Nelson, L. D. and Brown, A. (2010). Shared Social Responsibility: A Field Experiment in Pay-What-You-Want Pricing and Charitable Giving. Science, 329 (5989), 325–27.
- Epley, N., & Gneezy, A. (2007). The Framing of Financial Windfalls and Implications for Public Policy. Journal of Socio-Economics, 36, 36–47.
- Gneezy, A., & Epley, N. (2007). Prospect Theory. In R. Baumeister, & K. D. Vohs (Eds.), Encyclopedia of Social Psychology (Vol. 2, 711–14). Thousand Oaks, CA: Sage.
