= Sally Sadoff =

American economist

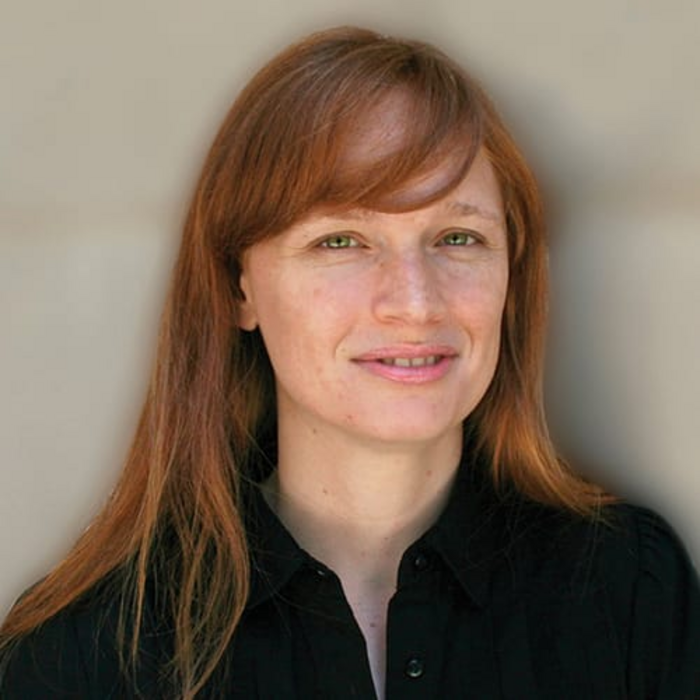

Academic background
- Education: Harvard University; University of Chicago

Academic work
- Discipline: Behavioral economics
- Institutions: UCSD Rady School of Management
- Website: rady.ucsd.edu/faculty-research/faculty/sally-sadoff.html

Sally Sadoff is an American economist and academic who serves as the Arthur Brody Chair in Management Leadership and Professor of Economics and Strategy at the Rady School of Management at the University of California, San Diego. She is known for her research in applied microeconomics, with a focus on behavioral economics, experimental economics, labor economics, and human capital development. She has been cited in national media for her research on educational performance and behavioral interventions and appeared on the Freakonomics podcast.

== Education ==
Sadoff earned her Bachelor of Arts degree in Economics from Harvard University in 2000. She completed her Master of Arts in Economics at the University of Chicago in 2008, followed by her Ph.D. in Economics from the same institution in 2010.

== Career ==
After completing her doctoral studies, Sadoff served as a Griffin Postdoctoral Scholar at the University of Chicago from 2010 to 2011. She then joined the faculty at UC San Diego's Rady School of Management as an Assistant Professor in 2011, and to Associate Professor in 2019, was promoted to Full Professor in 2023. She currently holds the Arthur Brody Chair in Management Leadership.

In 2015, Sadoff served as a Visiting Assistant Professor at The Ohio State University.

== Research ==
Sadoff's research in applied microeconomics focuses on behavioral economics, experimental economics, labor and human capital. Her work extensively uses field experiments to study educational interventions and behavioral economics applications. Her studies on student motivation, incentives, and effort in standardized testing have been featured in major media outlets.

=== Education research ===
Much of Sadoff's research has focused on educational policy and student motivation. Her notable collaborations include work with economists Steven Levitt, John A. List, and others on projects examining how behavioral economics can improve educational outcomes. One of her most cited papers, "The Behavioralist Goes to School: Leveraging Behavioral Economics to Improve Educational Performance," published in the American Economic Journal: Economic Policy in 2016 with Steven Levitt, John A. List, and Susanne Neckermann, explores how behavioral insights can be applied to educational settings.

=== Behavioral economics ===
Sadoff has conducted extensive research on loss aversion, commitment devices, and behavioral interventions. Her work "Do People Anticipate Loss Aversion?" with Alex Imas and Anya Samek, published in Management Science in 2016, examines how individuals respond to the offer of loss-framed contracts.

== Selected publications ==
Sadoff has published extensively in top-tier economics journals. Her most notable publications include:

- "Enhancing the Efficacy of Teacher Incentives through Loss Aversion: A Field Experiment" (2022), American Economic Journal: Economic Policy, with Roland Fryer, Steven Levitt, and John A. List
- "Dynamic Inconsistency in Food Choice: Experimental Evidence from Two Food Deserts" (2020), Review of Economic Studies, with Anya Samek and Charles Sprenger
- "Improving College Instruction through Incentives" (2020), Journal of Political Economy, with Andy Brownback
- "The Behavioralist Goes to School: Leveraging Behavioral Economics to Improve Educational Performance" (2016), American Economic Journal: Economic Policy, with Steven Levitt, John A. List, and Susanne Neckermann
- "Checkmate: Exploring Backward Induction among Chess Players" (2011), American Economic Review, with Steven Levitt and John A. List

== Honors and recognition ==
Sadoff has received numerous grants and awards for her research, including funding from the National Science Foundation, the Laura and John Arnold Foundation, and J-PAL North America. Sadoff was named a 2013–2014 Hellman Faculty Fellow at the University of California, San Diego.
