= Dana L. Suskind =

American surgeon (born 1968)

- Born: April 7, 1968
- Education: University of Missouri–Kansas City (B.S.); University of Missouri–Kansas City School of Medicine (M.D.)
- Spouse: John A. List
- Medical career
- Profession: Pediatrician
- Institutions: University of Chicago Medical Center
- Sub-specialties: Otolaryngology

Dana L. Suskind (born April 7, 1968) is an American surgeon and pediatrician who is serving as the Professor of Surgery and Pediatrics at the University of Chicago Medical Center (UChicago Medicine). In addition, she is also the director of UChicago Medicine's Pediatric Hearing Loss and Cochlear Implant program, and founder and co-director of the TMW Center for Early Learning + Public Health at the University of Chicago.

Suskind specializes in early childhood development, and has written several books for parents on that subject, including Thirty Million Words and Parent Nation. Her most recent book is Human Raised, published in 2026. Suskind has conducted research on parents and caregivers' capacities to drive foundational brain development for children from ages birth to three, particularly those born into poverty. She currently serves as a member of the advisory council for Too Small to Fail, as well as on the advisory board of Surviving Life After a Parent Dies (SLAP'D), a non-profit founded by her daughter, Genevieve, focused on providing support to adolescents with recently deceased parents.

== Early life and education ==
Suskind received her B.S. from the University of Missouri–Kansas City and her M.D. from the University of Missouri–Kansas City School of Medicine. Suskind completed her residency in otolaryngology head and neck surgery at the Hospital of the University of Pennsylvania, and her fellowship in pediatric otolaryngology at the Children's Hospital of the Washington University School of Medicine in St. Louis.

== Career ==
In 2002, Suskind joined UChicago Medicine as a pediatric otolaryngologist. In 2007, Suskind founded UChicago Medicine's Pediatric Hearing Loss and Cochlear Implant program.

In treating children born with hearing loss across the socioeconomic spectrum, Suskind became increasingly aware of a persistent gap in outcomes among her patient population, as detailed in her popular science book Thirty Million Words. In 2008, Suskind founded Project ASPIRE, a family-centered early intervention program to address this gap and help ensure that all cochlear implant patients receive the rich language exposure implicated in the success of cochlear implantation to reach their full listening and spoken language potential.

In 2010, Suskind broadened her focus beyond her patient population and founded the Thirty Million Words Initiative, a translational research program focused on testing and developing parent-centered interventions to boost early learning outcomes for economically disadvantaged children. In 2013, working with the White House Office of Science and Technology Policy, Suskind and colleagues organized a cross-sector convening entitled "Bridging the Thirty Million Word Gap". In 2015, Suskind's Thirty Million Words: Building a Child's Brain was published by Dutton.

In 2017, Suskind joined with University of Chicago economist John A. List to launch the TMW Center for Early Learning + Public Health at the University of Chicago. In 2018, the TMW Center selected Palm Beach County, Florida as the site of its first community-wide rollout to embed its evidence-based interventions within existing health, education and social service systems. Suskind and List have developed a line of research on threats to scalability, which uses an economic model to address scale-up effects in public policy.

In 2022, Suskind published Parent Nation: Unlocking Every Child's Potential, Fulfilling Society's Promise. In many ways, Parent Nation is the natural successor to Thirty Million Words: Building a Child's Brain. While Thirty Million Words applies the neuroscience of early childhood brain development to the individual, Parent Nation used that same neuroscience to analyze society as a whole. Suskind argues for a system of robust and comprehensive supports for parents and caregivers. Parent Nation became a New York Times, Wall Street Journal, and USA Today bestseller.

== Research reception ==
The original Hart and Risley research study upon which Suskind's Thirty Million Words Initiative is based has been found to be methodologically flawed, contain ethnocentric bias, and lack a clearly articulated theoretical framework of language and culture. Researchers found that "strong claims about language deficiencies in poor children and their families based on the Hart and Risley study are unwarranted". The original study only analyzed speech between the child and their primary caregiver and did not include language directed at children from other family members and community members, or overheard speech.

Recent research has failed to replicated Hart and Risley's findings.

In 2019, Suskind wrote that she acknowledged the shortcomings of the Hart and Risley study and that there was a need to move beyond the idea of a 30-million-word gap. She explained that the name of her research center at the University of Chicago was changed from “Thirty Million Words” to “The TMW Center for Early Learning + Public Health” to convey “a more evolved and accurate understanding of the science".

== Personal life ==
Suskind was married to Don Liu from 1995 to 2012. In 2012, Liu, then section chief of pediatric surgery and surgeon-in-chief at UChicago Medicine's Comer Children's Hospital, drowned after attempting to rescue two children who were caught in a strong current in Lake Michigan near the town of Lakeside, Michigan.

In 2018, Suskind married American economist John A. List. The couple resides in the Hyde Park neighborhood of Chicago with their blended family of eight children.

== Academic publications ==
Suskind is recognized for her work on early education disparities and parent and caregiver investment, and her research includes over 35 peer-reviewed publications.

== Reception ==
Suskind's work has been widely covered by the media, including The New York Times, Freakonomics Radio, National Public Radio, The Economist, and Chicago Tribune.

== Recognition ==
- 2015 LENA Research Foundation "Making a Difference" Award
- 2016 Society for Ear, Nose, and Throat Advances in Children (SENTAC) Gray Humanitarian Award
- 2017 Weizmann Women for Science Vision and Impact Award
- 2018 John D. Arnold, MD Mentor Award for Sustained Excellence from the Pritzker School of Medicine
- 2018 Alexander Graham Bell Association for the Deaf and Hard of Hearing Chairman's Award
