= Adrian Sargeant =

British academic

Adrian Sargeant (born 27 October 1964) is a British academic who is co-founder and co-director of the Institute for Sustainable Philanthropy. He was formerly Professor of Fundraising at the Lilly Family School of Philanthropy at Indiana University where he was the first Robert F. Hartsook Chair in Fundraising.

Sargeant is one of the foremost authorities in the domain of fundraising, being consistently voted one of the top ten most influential people in the field by readers of Professional Fundraising Magazine. He was cited as the Wall Street Journal's Gift of the Week, 13 October 2006

== Professional life ==
In 2004, Sargeant pioneered the public information website www.charityfacts.org designed to bolster public trust and confidence in the UK’s charity sector. The site was underpinned by an ongoing benchmarking study tracking the fundraising performance of a cross section of charities. More recently, Sargeant developed the UK’s new National Occupational Standard for Fundraising, specifying the skills and knowledge required of fundraisers working in a variety of different roles within the profession.

In 2008, he was honoured by the Institute of Fundraising for his services to the profession of fundraising, becoming an Honorary Fellow of the Institute. Along with Stephen Lee, Sargeant is calling for a greater investment in meaningful fundraising research in the UK

In 2010, he received a Civil Society Award for his Outstanding Contribution to Fundraising and was named to the prestigious Nonprofit Times' Top 50 Power and Influence List.

In 2012, Sargeant joined Bloomerang, a nonprofit fundraising software start-up, as Chief Scientist, helping to incorporate concepts from his 2004 book Building Donor Loyalty: The Fundraiser's Guide To Increasing Lifetime Value into the company's software.

In 2014, Sargeant was tapped to lead the philanthropic psychology research centre at Plymouth University.

In 2018, Sargeant left the University of Plymouth to launch the Institute for Sustainable Philanthropy, an independent research Institute that is now the home of the new science of philanthropic psychology. Sargeant is a co-director of the Institute alongside his colleague Prof Jen Shang.

== Books ==
- Sargeant, A (1999) Marketing Management For Nonprofit Organisations, Oxford University Press.
- Sargeant, A and McKenzie, J (1998) A Lifetime Of Giving: An Analysis of Donor Lifetime Value, Charities Aid Foundation, West Malling.
- Sargeant, A and Kaehler, J (1998) Benchmarking Charity Costs, Charities Aid Foundation, West Malling.
- Sargeant, A and West, D (2001) Direct and Interactive Marketing, Oxford University Press, Oxford.
- Sargeant, A and Jay, E (2004) Fundraising Management: Analysis, Planning and Practice, Routledge, London.
- Sargeant, A and Jay, E (2004) Building Donor Loyalty: The Fundraiser’s Guide To Increasing Lifetime Value, Jossey Bass, San Francisco.
- Sargeant, A (2004) Marketing W Organizacjach Non Profit, Oficyna Ekonomiczna, Kraków, Poland.
- Sargeant, A and Wymer, W (2007) The Routledge Companion To Nonprofit Marketing, Routledge London.
- Sargeant, A (2009) Marketing Management for Nonprofit Organizations, (3rd ed.) Oxford University Press, Oxford.
- Sargeant, A and Shang, J (2024) Fundraising Principles & Practice, 3rd Edition, Jossey Bass, San Francisco.
- Sargeant, A and George (2022) Fundraising Management, 4th Edition, Routledge, London.
