= Bob Hartsook =

American fundraising executive and philanthropist

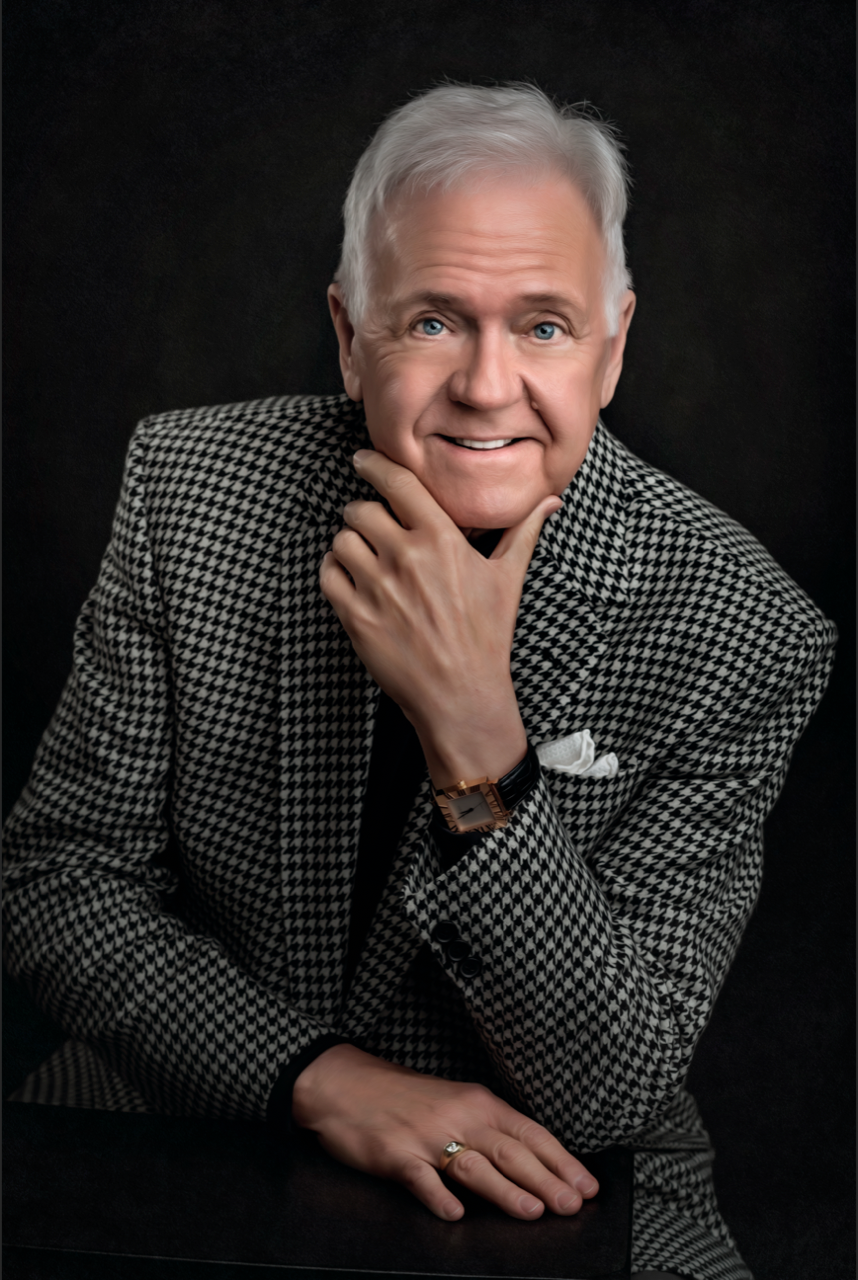
- Born: Emporia, Kansas
- Education: Emporia State University; Washburn University
- Occupations: Fundraising executive and philanthropist

Robert F. Hartsook (born July 1, 1948) is an American fundraising executive and philanthropist. Founder and chairman emeritus of global fundraising counsel Hartsook, he is also the founder of Hartsook Institutes for Fundraising, an organization focused on growing the academic study of fundraising. During his time leading fundraising counsel Hartsook, the firm assisted more than 6,000 nonprofit partners around the world in raising over $231 billion. Through Hartsook Institutes, he established the U.S.’s first endowed chair in fundraising at Indiana University’s Lilly Family School of Philanthropy, currently held by economist John A. List.

== Early life and education ==
Born in Emporia, Kan., Hartsook received a bachelor's in social sciences from Emporia State University in 1970 and a master's in counseling in 1972. In 1979, he graduated from Washburn University School of Law, where he was executive editor of the school's law journal.

== Career ==
Hartsook began his career as dean of students at Colby Community College. After taking a role as vice president of Colby in 1971, he became the youngest person in the country to hold a higher education executive position.

After graduating from law school, Hartsook became executive vice president of the Kansas Engineering Society, where he was asked to raise funds for an engineering foundation intended to promote the industry. In 1981, he accepted a role as vice president of alumni, lobbying and community relations at Washburn University. Put in charge of a $21 million fundraising campaign, this position gave Hartsook some of his first exposure to fundraising.

From 1981 to 1990, Hartsook served as vice president for advancement and president of the board of trustees at Wichita State University. During this time, he led a $100 million fundraising campaign along with university president Warren Armstrong, one of only 30 campaigns of this size in the 1980s. In 1985, he led an effort to change the university's name to The Wichita State University.

In 1990, Hartsook left Wichita State to start his own fundraising consulting firm, Hartsook Companies. By 2018, the company reported serving over 6,000 nonprofit clients worldwide, assisting in raising over $231 billion.

== Hartsook Institutes and philanthropy ==
In 2006, Hartsook made a $1.5 million gift to the Center on Philanthropy at Indiana University (now the Lilly Family School of Philanthropy) to establish the nation's first endowed academic chair in fundraising. Fundraising scholar and first holder of the chair Adrian Sargeant said, “Bob's generosity presents us with an opportunity to develop the knowledge base for fundraisers and to begin a program of applied research that meets the real information needs of the profession.” The current Visiting Hartsook Chair is Arrow Prize-winning behavioral economist John A. List.

In 2009, Hartsook and Hartsook Companies established the Hartsook Institutes for Fundraising in partnership with Avila University. The gift also created a degree program for professional fundraisers at Avila. The institute is focused on “knowledge-based education rather than the outdated anecdotal approach used widely by other fundraising institutions.”

Hartsook provided $1 million in funding for the University of Plymouth’s Centre for Sustainable Philanthropy in 2016, which has since been named Hartsook Centre for Sustainable Philanthropy. The Centre provides opportunities for individuals to study fundraising in order to “respond to donor needs globally and to address our core mission of enhancing the quality of their philanthropic experience.”

Hartsook also established a creative writing fellowship at the University of North Carolina Wilmington.

== Personal life ==
Hartsook is a member of Sigma Phi Epsilon fraternity. He is the father of hip-hop producer L’Orange.

== Awards and recognition ==
- 2003 Emporia State Distinguished Alumnus
- 2004 Indiana University Spirit of Philanthropy Award
- 2017 Washburn University School of Law Lifetime Achievement Award
- 2017 University of Plymouth Honorary Doctorate
- 2017 Sigma Phi Epsilon Citation
- 2021 Colby College Hall of Fame

== Books ==
- $231 Billion Raised and Counting (2016, with Matthew J. Beem and Karin Cox). ISBN 978-9663667393
- Reality Fundraising: Proven, Practical Ideas for the Enlightened Fundraiser (2005). ISBN 978-0966367379
- On the Money: 25 Inspiring Stories to Ignite Your Fundraising (2004). ISBN 978-0966367362
- Nobody Wants to Give Money Away (2002). ISBN 978-0966367355
- Getting Your Ducks in a Row! (2001). ISBN 978-0966367348
- How to Get Million Dollar Gifts and Have Donors Thank You (1999). ISBN 978-0966367317
- Closing that Gift! How to be Successful 99% of the Time (1998). ISBN 978-0966367300
