= Yoav Kislev =

Israeli economist

- יואב כסלו
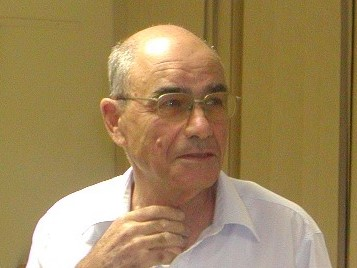
- Yoav Kislev at his retirement event, Rehovot, December 2002
- Born: 1932; Haifa, Palestine
- Died: 19 June 2017 (aged 84–85); Rehovot, Israel
- Occupation: Agricultural economist
- Years active: 1968–2017
- Known for: Contributions to economics of agricultural research, agricultural and rural cooperation, utility regulation, water economy
- Notable work: Agricultural Research and Productivity (1975, with R.E. Evanson); The Water Economy of Israel (2014)

Yoav Kislev (Hebrew: יואב כסלו; born 1932 in Haifa – died 19 June 2017 in Rehovot) was an Israeli agricultural and water economist, who continued until his death with active research as professor emeritus of agricultural economics at the Department of Environmental Economics and Management in the Rehovot Campus of the Hebrew University of Jerusalem.

== Early life ==
Yoav Kislev matriculated from the prestigious Hebrew Reali School in Haifa and at the age of 18 joined the Nahal Corps, doing his military service in Kibbutz Mahanayim in the Hula Valley in Northern Israel. His years on the kibbutz introduced him to agriculture and agricultural economics became the focus of his professional life. The Hula Valley provided the backdrop for his first book, published in 1975.

== Education ==
He earned his bachelor's and master's degrees in agriculture from the Hebrew University of Jerusalem in 1960–1961 and continued his doctoral studies in the department of economics at the University of Chicago. He earned his PhD degree in economics from the University of Chicago in 1965.

== Professional life ==
Kislev returned from Chicago to the Hebrew University in 1965 to a position of lecturer in agricultural economics at the Faculty of Agriculture in the Rehovot Campus. He spent his first sabbatical abroad as visiting scholar at the Economic Growth Center in Yale University (1970–1972), where he began his long-term professional collaboration with Robert E. Evanson on the economics of agricultural research and extension. After Yale, he returned to the Hebrew University with the rank of senior lecturer in agricultural economics (1973) and was subsequently promoted to associate professor (1975) and full professor (1988). From 1978 until his retirement in 2002, he was the holder of the Sir Henry d'Avigdor Goldsmid Chair in Agricultural Economics. His second period in the United States covered the years 1978–1979, when he was visiting professor at the Department of Agricultural and Applied Economics in the University of Minnesota, St. Paul. In UMN, he closely collaborated with Willis Peterson on innovation and technological change. One of the papers that grew out of this collaboration received the 2000 AAEA award for Publication of Enduring Quality. He went to the United States two more times, in 1985–1986, when he was a visitor at the World Bank's Development Research Department, working mainly on agricultural labor economics, and in 1998, for a teaching appointment at Dartmouth College, which was cut short by an illness.

Kislev's research covered four main areas:

- The economics of agricultural research (work begun in Yale with Robert Evanson);
- Technology and relative prices as determinants of farm size and farm mechanization (work begun at UMN with Willis Peterson);
- Water economy (especially from the Israeli perspective);
- Agricultural and rural cooperation (work triggered by the financial crisis of cooperative agriculture in Israel in 1986).

Kislev published more than 60 articles, books, chapters, and studies in English. These include publications in leading academic journals, such as American Journal of Agricultural Economics, Journal of Political Economy, Economic Development and Cultural Change, European Review of Agricultural Economics, Journal of Comparative Economics, and Agricultural Economics. Kislev's professional and private views on agricultural and water policy in Israel were extensively published in Hebrew, critically shaping the Israeli decision-makers' opinions over the years.

Kislev retired from active teaching in 2002, but he tirelessly continued as an emeritus with his research in the water economy of Israel and his participation in public committees.

== Public service ==
Yoav Kislev's public service at the Faculty of Agriculture included chair of the Agricultural Economics Studies Program (1968–1969), four stints as the head of the Department of Agricultural Economics and Management (between 1974 and 1988), and a term as director of research at the Center for Agricultural Economic Research in Rehovot. Yoav's public service outside the university included membership in various public and national committees, including the Committee for Agricultural Strategy 1989, the Ottolenghi Committee to inquire into the Agricultural Research Administration 1995–1996, the Arlozorov Committee for Water Reform in Israel 1996–1997, the Zusman Committee for Agricultural and Rural Policy 1995, the Advisory Committee for Rate Regulation in Water and Sewage Corporations 2004–2005 ("the Gronau committee"), and the State Commission of Inquiry into Water Economy Management 2009–2010.

== Books ==
- The Water Economy of Israel, LAP – Lambert Academic Publishing, 2014
- Agricultural Cooperatives in Transition (with Csaba Csaki, eds.), Westview, 1993
- A Supply Cooperative of Moshavim: Plants, Economic Functioning, and Finance, Magnes Press, Jerusalem, 1988 (Hebrew)
- Agricultural Research and Productivity (with Robert E. Evanson), Yale University Press, 1975
- An Economic Analysis of Flood Control Projects in the Hula Valley (with Binyamin Nadel and Yeshayahu Nun), The Center for Agricultural Economic Research, Rehovot, 1975 (Hebrew).

== Selected articles in English ==
- "A Model of Agricultural Research," in Resource Allocation and Productivity in National and International Agricultural Research, eds: Thomas M. Arndt, Dana G. Dalrymple and Vernon W. Ruttan, University of Minnesota Press, 1977.
- "Induced Innovations and Farm Mechanization," American Journal of Agricultural Economics, 63:562-65, 1981 (With Willis Peterson)
- "Prices, Technology and Farm Size," Journal of Political Economy, 90:578-95, 1982 (With Willis Peterson)
- "The Cotton Harvester in Retrospect: Labor Displacement or Replacement?" Journal of Economic History, 46:199-216, 1986 (With Willis Peterson)
- "The Evenson-Kislev 'Research as Search' Model and the Green Revolution," Annales d'Economie et de Statistique, 79/80:613-628, 2005. (With Robert E. Evenson)
- "Overestimates of Returns to Scale in Agriculture – A Case of Synchronized Aggregation," Journal of Farm Economics, 48:967-83, Nov. 1966.
- "Prices, Technology and Farm Size," Journal of Political Economy, 90:578-95, 1982 (With Willis Peterson)
- "Economies of Scale in Agriculture: A Reexamination of the Evidence," in The Economics of Agriculture, Volume 2: Papers in Honor of D. Gale Johnson, eds.: John M. Antle and Daniel A. Sumner, Chicago, 1996, pp. 156–170 (With Willis Peterson)
- "Old Age Security and Inter-Generational Transfer of family Farms," European Review of Agricultural Economics, 26(1):19-37, 1999 (With Claudio Pasquin and Ayal Kimhi).
- "Cooperation in the Moshav," Journal of Comparative Economics, 8:54-73, 1984. (With Nava Haruvi)
- "Recent Experience with Cooperative Farm Credit in Israel," Economic Development and Cultural Change, July 1991, 39:773-89. (With Zvi Lerman and Pinhas Zusman)
- "Agricultural Cooperatives in Israel, Past and Present," in: Ayal Kimhi and Zvi Lerman (eds.) Agricultural Transition in Post-Soviet Europe and Central Asia after 20 Years, IAMO – Leibniz Institute of Agricultural Development in Central and Eastern Europe, Halle, Germany, 2015.
- "Prices vs. Quantities: The Political Perspective," Journal of Political Economy, 105:83-100, 1995. (With Israel Finkelshtain)
- "Taxes and Subsidies in a Polluting and Politically Powerful Industry," Asian Journal of Economics, 15(3):481-92, 2004. (With Israel Finkelshtain)
- "Economic Aspects of Irrigation with Treated Wastewater," in: Guy J. Levy, Pinchas Fine, and Asher Bar-Tal (eds), Treated Wastewater in Agriculture, Wiley-Blackwell, 2011 (With Efrat Hadas)
- "Water Pricing in Israel in Theory and Practice," in: Sharon B. Megdal, Robert Varady, and Susanna Eden (eds.) Shared Borders Shared Water, CRC, 2013.
- "Water in Agriculture," in: Nir Becker (ed.) Water Policy in Israel, Springer, 2013.
