= John A. List =

American economist (born 1968)

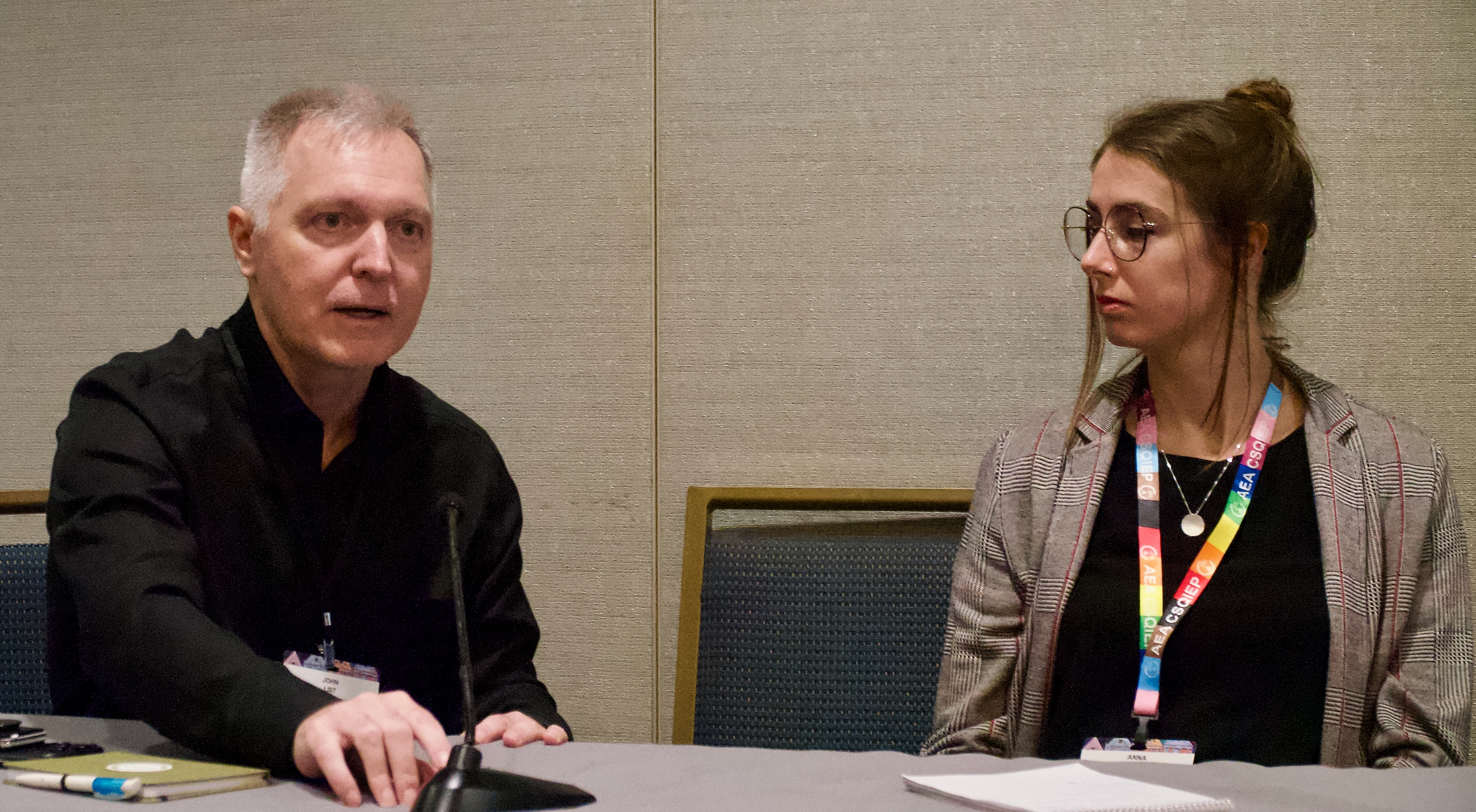
- John List with Anna Stansbury at AEA 2025 in San Francisco
- Born: John August List; September 25, 1968 (age 58); Madison, Wisconsin, U.S.
- Spouse(s): Dana L. Suskind (m. 2018)

Academic background
- Education: University of Wisconsin, Stevens Point (BA); University of Wyoming (PhD)
- Doctoral advisor: Shelby Gerking
- Influences: Vernon Smith; Gary Becker

Academic work
- Discipline: Economics
- School or tradition: Behavioral economics Experimental economics
- Institutions: University of Chicago
- Doctoral students: Sally Sadoff
- Website: Information at IDEAS / RePEc

John August List (born September 25, 1968) is an American economist known for his work in establishing field experiments as a tool in empirical economic analysis. Since 2016, he has served as the Kenneth C. Griffin Distinguished Service Professor of Economics at the University of Chicago, where he was Chairman of the Department of Economics from 2012 to 2018, and Director of the Becker Friedman Institute for Research in Economics since 2025. Since 2016, he has also served as Visiting Robert F. Hartsook Chair in Fundraising at the Lilly Family School of Philanthropy at Indiana University. In 2011, List was elected to the American Academy of Arts and Sciences, and in 2011, he was elected a Fellow of the Econometric Society. In 2024, Omicron Delta Epsilon, the international honor society for economics, gave List the biennial John R. Commons Award.

List is noted for his pioneering contributions to field experimentation in economics, with Nobel laureate economist George Akerlof and noted law professor Cass Sunstein writing that "List has done more than anyone else to advance the methods and practice of field experiments." Nobel laureate economist Gary Becker quipped that "John List's work in field experiments is revolutionary." In her Nobel Prize lecture, Esther Duflo noted that "Before us, economists like John List had shown how powerful field experiments could be for testing behavioral theories outside the lab." Further, in the introduction of their Handbook of Field Experiments (2017), Duflo and Abhijeet Banerjee acknowledge List's role in bringing field experiments into mainstream economics when writing: "John List's early work in the field, such as his experiments in real markets, demonstrated the feasibility and insights of randomized interventions in natural environments well before they became widespread in development economics."

List received his bachelor's degree from the University of Wisconsin–Stevens Point and his Ph.D. from the University of Wyoming in 1996. His first teaching position was at the University of Central Florida; he later moved to the University of Arizona and then to the University of Maryland, College Park (where he still holds an adjunct position), before moving to the University of Chicago. List also spends time at Tilburg University, where he is a distinguished visiting scholar, and at Resources for the Future, where he is a University Distinguished Scholar. From May 2002 to July 2003 he served on the Council of Economic Advisers as a senior economist. He has written two popular science books. According to RePEc, List is the top ranked economist worldwide of the 40,000 economists who graduated in the last 20 years, and as of August 2025, RePEc ranks him as the 5th most influential economist in the world.

== Early life and career ==
List was born on 25 September 1968 in a working-class household in Madison, Wisconsin. His grandfather, father, and older brother were in the lorry business. List aspired to be a professional golfer in his youth, and attended Sun Prairie High School, graduating in 1987. He later attended the University of Wisconsin-Stevens Point, where he initially played golf but "later found [his] skills as an economist were much more scalable than [his] skills as a golfer." He received his Ph.D. from the University of Wyoming in 1996. He began his career at the University of Central Florida as an assistant professor in 1996. He became an associate professor in 2000 at the University of Arizona. In 2001 he was awarded a full professorship at the University of Maryland, College Park. He held that post until 2004, when he received an appointment as a full professor at the Economics Department of the University of Chicago.

In addition to his university career, List served as the first chief economist for taxi company Uber, and later for the similar company Lyft. List became the first chief economist for the Walmart corporation in April 2022.

== Awards ==
In November 2014 he was awarded an honorary doctorate by Tilburg University. In 2015 he was elected Fellow of the Econometric Society. In 2015 and 2016, he was named to the Nonprofit Times Power & Influence Top 50. In 2017, he received the Hartsook Growing Philanthropy Award. In May 2022 he was awarded an honorary doctorate by Prague University of Economics and Business.

== Work ==
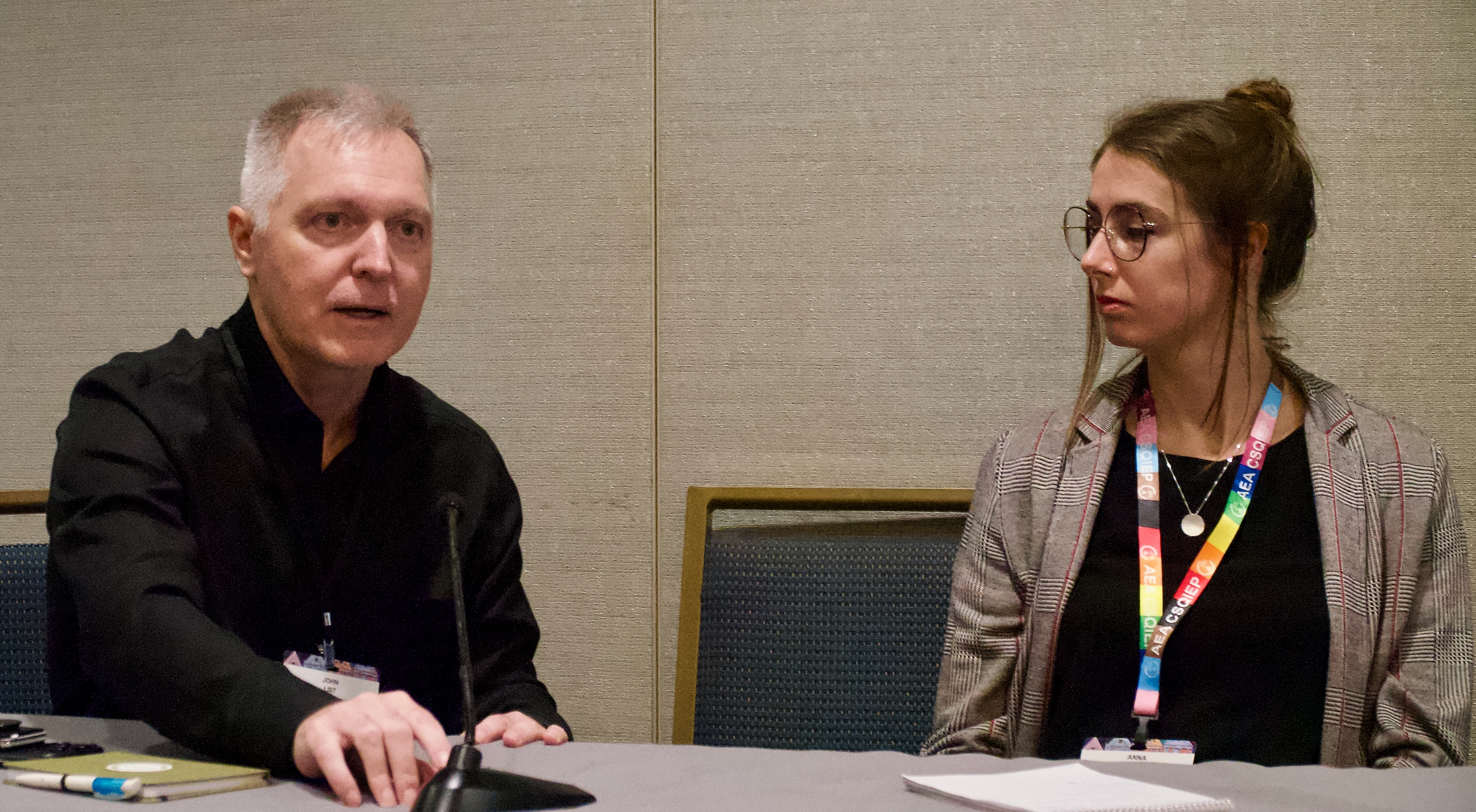
List with Anna Stansbury at AEA 2025 in San Francisco

His work focuses on microeconomic issues, and includes over 250 academic publications.

=== Behavioral economics ===
List's research on behavioral economics has focused on testing theories like gift exchange, social preferences, and prospect theory. Traditional tests of these theories relied on recruiting undergraduate students to participate in experiments for a small amount of money. List instead recruited subjects in actual marketplaces to participate in experiments, sometimes unbeknownst to even the subjects. List's field experiments have found that gift exchange is not as powerful a motivator of labor effort as earlier research found, that social preferences are not as pronounced as prior research found, and that the divergence between Willingness to Pay and Willingness to Accept often called the endowment effect, predicted by prospect theory, disappears with market experience.

List's recent work in behavioral economics has found that framing can induce increased worker productivity, and has been picked up by several corporations around the world.

=== Environmental economics ===
List has published research on the impact of environmental regulation on economic production and on endangered species. List's research has also focused on testing non-market valuation mechanisms in the field frequently used in contingent valuation and in testing different incentives to promote environmentally friendly technology adoption.

=== Charitable giving ===
List has also brought social preferences and value of public goods to the marketplace by testing determinants of charitable giving. List has found that a number of the traditional techniques in the philanthropy world are not well understood. For example, the higher the announced seed money the more people give. Also, matching grants increase giving, but it doesn't matter if the match is 1:1 or 3:1. List has also found that giving is easily influenced by incentives that discount the importance of altruism in motivating giving. For example, List has found that beauty and social pressure are important motivators for giving. In an experiment through a solicitation mailed to 300,000 households in Alaska, List found that people are more likely to give because they want to feel good, rather than from pure altruism.

Some of his field experimental work on charitable fundraising were highlighted in The New York Times Magazine. In a 2009 Crain's Chicago Business article, List is referred to as a "rock star" in the area of philanthropy. In his role as Visiting Robert F. Hartsook Chair in Fundraising at Indiana's Lilly School of Philanthropy, he works to apply academic research for the benefit of fundraising practitioners. He also serves as principal investigator for the Science of Philanthropy Initiative.

=== Education ===
List's recent research focuses on increasing educational achievement. In 2008 he worked with Chicago Heights, IL to design cash incentives for ninth graders and their parents to increase academic performance. In 2009 he won a $10 million grant from the Griffin Foundation to study the returns to pre-school education by beginning a research study called the Chicago Heights Early Childhood Center (CHECC) and to test the impact of performance pay for teachers in Chicago Heights, IL.

The CHECC is aimed at studying programs that will decrease the achievement gap. The goal of CHECC is to intervene as early as possible to generate effects that are as great as possible. The center was started by List together with world-renowned scholars at the University of Chicago and Harvard University, was awarded a $10M grant from the Griffin Foundation to launch the Chicago Heights Early Childhood Center (CHECC), one of the most comprehensive longitudinal early childhood studies ever conducted. With nearly 1,500 child participants, CHECC aimed to identify programs and strategies for improving student education in America's schools and to try to understand how to best foster development during the early years of a child's life and to place children on a successful path. Test scores of children participating showing improvement, the 2011-2012 mid-year assessment scores revealed an impressive 16.75% percentile increase from 2010 fall assessment scores. Children entering the program often test below average (35.5-percentile), but by the mid-year assessment of the second year, the majority of children are scoring at average (50-percentile), priming them for kindergarten and further educational attainment.

As part of the CHECC Professor List and his team also established a Parent Academy, a program that paid parents a stipend of up to $7,000 per year to attend bi-weekly workshops with their children and learn about parenting strategies. Findings from their randomized evaluation reveal that incentives to parents lead to large gains in achievement and that preschool programs may result in sustained positive impacts on achievement. They continue to track progress and results for graduated students.

List co-founded and co-directs the Thirty Million Words Center for Early Learning and Public Health along with Dana L. Suskind.

=== Other research ===
List has studied the economics of discrimination, finding that discrimination in marketplaces is statistical discrimination, rarely motivated by animus. He has also investigated gender differences in competition and wages, finding that men are more likely to apply for jobs that offer incentive pay than women. He has also researched the role of gender in competition in matrilineal and patriarchal societies, finding that women in matrilineal societies opt to compete at similar levels to men in patriarchal societies. List has also used experiments to test ideas in finance. He has tested the options model, information cascades, and the equity premium puzzle with undergraduate students and professional traders. Many of these ideas were advanced by List when he taught at the Finnish School of Finance in 2007 on field experiments in Finance.

=== Publications ===
In his first popular science book, The Why Axis (co-authored with Uri Gneezy), List uses field experiments to offer new insights in various areas of economics research, such as education, private provision of public goods, discrimination, social preferences, prospect theory, environmental economics, marketplace effects on corporate and government policy decisions, gender and inclusion, corporate social responsibility and auctions. The book became an international best-seller and presented List's field experiments from the early 1990s until 2010.

List published a second popular book, The Voltage Effect, in February, 2022, that has become a runaway best seller, making the Wall Street Journal, New York Times, USA Today, Publishers Weekly, Porchlight, Washington Post, and LA Times best seller lists. The book is based on a collection of academic articles written by List on scaling. With a suite of coauthors, List has produced both theoretical and empirical insights concerning the "science of using science." In The Voltage Effect, List argues that scaling, at its roots, is an Anna Karenina problem, overturning the conventional wisdom that the problem is a "silver bullet" or "best shot" problem. This leads List to present a thesis that "Every scalable idea is the same, each unscalable idea is unscalable in its own way."

== Personal life ==
List married pediatrician and surgeon Dana L. Suskind in 2018. They live in Hyde Park, Chicago, and have a blended family of eight children.

== Academic publications ==
- List, John A., "Informed Consent in Social Science," Science, October 21, 2008, 322(5886), p. 672.
- List, John A., "Homo experimentalis evolves," Science, July 11, 2008, 321(5886), pp. 207–208.
- Levitt, Steven D. and John A. List, "Homo economicus evolves," Science, February 15, 2008, 319(5865), pp. 909–910.
- Karlan, Dean and John A. List. "Does Price Matter in Charitable Giving? Evidence from a Large-Scale Natural Field Experiment," American Economic Review, (2007), 97(5), pp. 1774–1793.
- Harrison, Glenn W., John A. List, and Charles Towe, "Naturally Occurring Preferences and Exogenous Laboratory Experiments: A Case Study of Risk Aversion," Econometrica, (2007), 75 (2): 433–458.
- Alevy, Jon, Michael Haigh, and John A. List. "Information Cascades: Evidence from a Field Experiment with Financial Market Professionals," Journal of Finance, (2007), 62 (1): 151–180.
- List, John A. "On the Interpretation of Giving in Dictator Games," Journal of Political Economy, (2007), 115(3): 482–494.
- List, John A. and Daniel Sturm. "How Elections Matter: Theory and Evidence from Environmental Policy," Quarterly Journal of Economics, (2006), November 121(4): 1249–1281.
- Gneezy, Uri, and John A. List. "Putting Behavioral Economics to Work: Testing for Gift Exchange in Labor Markets Using Field Experiments," Econometrica, (2006), September, 74(5): 1365–1384.
- List, John A., "The Behavioralist Meets the Market: Measuring Social Preferences and Reputation Effects in Actual Transactions," Journal of Political Economy, (2006), 114(1): 1-37.
- Landry, Craig, Andreas Lange, John A. List, Michael K. Price, and Nicholas Rupp. "Toward an Understanding of the Economics of Charity: Evidence from a Field Experiment," Quarterly Journal of Economics, (2006), 121 (2): 747-782.
- Haigh, Michael and List, John A. "Do Professional Traders Exhibit Myopic Loss Aversion? An Experimental Analysis," Journal of Finance, (2005), 60 (1): 523–534.
- List, John A. and Michael Haigh. "A Simple Test of Expected Utility Theory Using Professional Traders," Proceedings of the National Academy of Sciences (2005), 102(3): 945–948.
- List, John A. "Testing Neoclassical Competitive Theory in Multi-Lateral Decentralized Markets," Journal of Political Economy (2004), 112(5): 1131–1156.
- List, John A. Robert Berrens, Alok Bohara, and Joe Kerkvliet. "Examining the Role of Social Isolation on Stated Preferences," American Economic Review (2004), 94 (3): 741–752.
- Harrison, Glenn and John A. List. "Field Experiments," Journal of Economic Literature (2004), XLII (December): 1013–1059.
- List, John A. "Neoclassical Theory Versus Prospect Theory: Evidence from the Marketplace," Econometrica (2004), 72(2): 615–625.
- List, John A. "The Nature and Extent of Discrimination in the Marketplace: Evidence from the Field," Quarterly Journal of Economics (2004), 119(1): 49–89.
- List, John A. "Does Market Experience Eliminate Market Anomalies?," Quarterly Journal of Economics (2003), 118(1), 41–71.
- Pacala, Steven, Erwin Bulte, John A. List, and Simon Levin, "False Alarm over Environmental False Alarms," Science (2003), 301(5637), 1187–1189.
- List, John A. "Preference Reversals of a Different Kind: The More is Less Phenomenon," American Economic Review (2002), 92(5): 1636–1643.
- List, John A. and Lucking-Reiley, David. "The Effects of Seed Money and Refunds on Charitable Giving: Experimental Evidence from a University Capital Campaign," Journal of Political Economy (2002), 110(1): 215–233
- List, John A. "Testing Neoclassical Competitive Market Theory in the Field," Proceedings of the National Academy of Sciences (2002), 99 (24): 15827–15830.
- List, John A. "Do Explicit Warnings Eliminate the Hypothetical Bias in Elicitation Procedures? Evidence from Field Auctions for Sportscards," American Economic Review (2001), 91(5): 1498–1507.
- List, John A. and Lucking-Reiley, David. "Demand Reduction in a Multi-Unit Auction: Evidence from a Sportscard Field Experiment," American Economic Review (2000), September, 90(4): 961–972.
- List John A. and Jason F. Shogren, "Calibration of the difference between actual and hypothetical valuations in a field experiment." Journal of Economic Behavior and Organization, (1998), 37 (2): 193–205.
