= Rady School of Management =

Graduate business school at the University of California, San Diego

UC San Diego Rady School of Management
- Former names: University of California, San Diego School of Management (2001–2004)
- Type: Public
- Established: 2001; 25 years ago
- Parent institution: University of California, San Diego
- Dean: Lisa Ordóñez
- Academic staff: 40
- Postgraduates: 3,200
- Location: San Diego, California, United States; 32.887°N 117.241°W
- Website: rady.ucsd.edu

The UC San Diego Rady School of Management is the business school of the University of California, San Diego. The school was established as the University of California, San Diego School of Management in 2001 and was named the Rady School of Management in January 2004.

== Campus ==
=== Otterson Hall ===
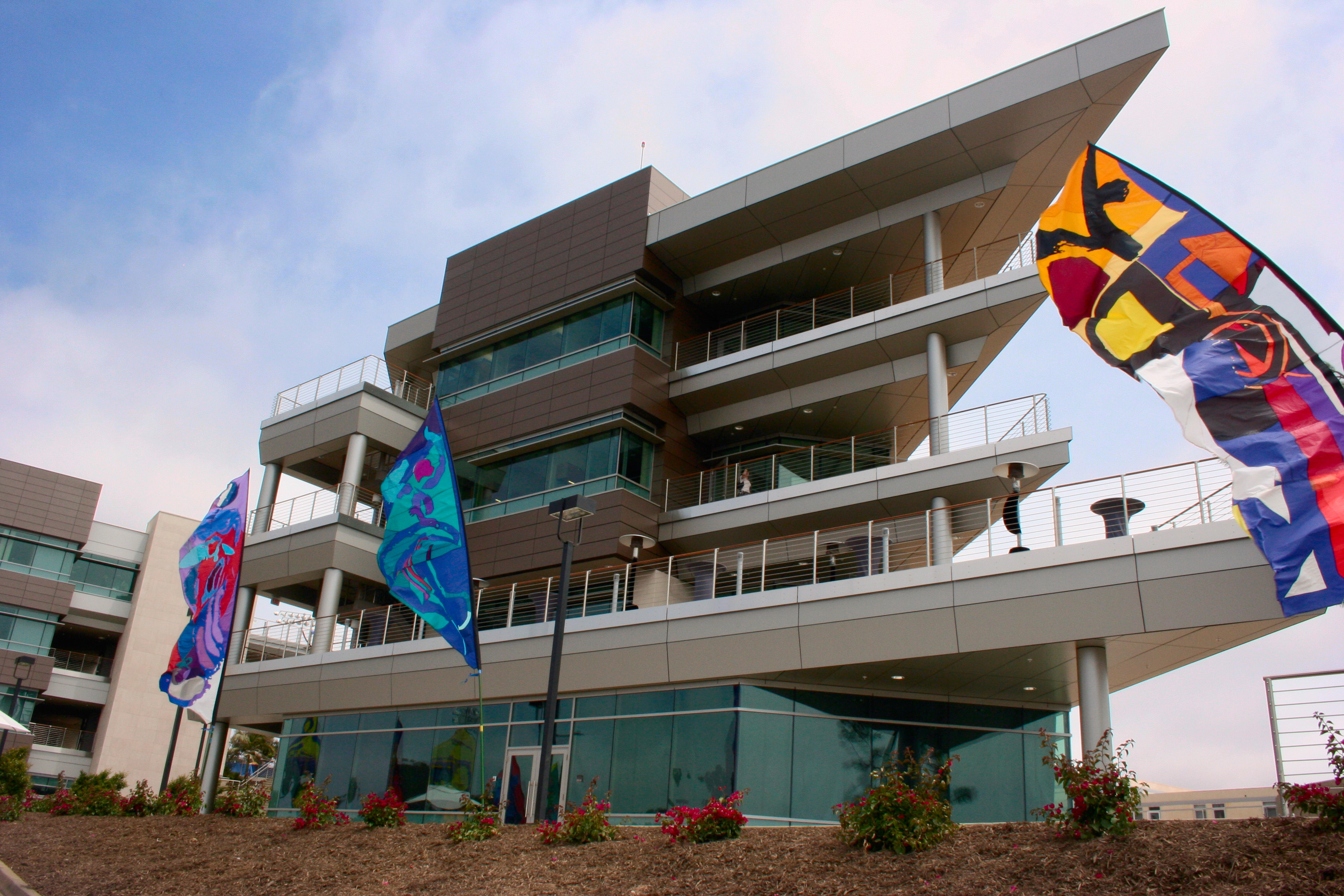
Otterson Hall at the Rady School

Otterson Hall, designed by Ellerbe Becket in the postmodern style, opened in 2007. It was named in honor of the late William (Bill) Otterson, co-founder of UC San Diego CONNECT, in appreciation for his contributions to the San Diego business community and his impact on the region.

The facility comprises 50,000 sq ft (4,600 m^{2}) of classrooms, offices and community space. The building provides views overlooking the Pacific Ocean and Torrey Pines Gliderport. Otterson Hall is powered in part by a rooftop solar photovoltaic system.

=== Wells Fargo Hall ===
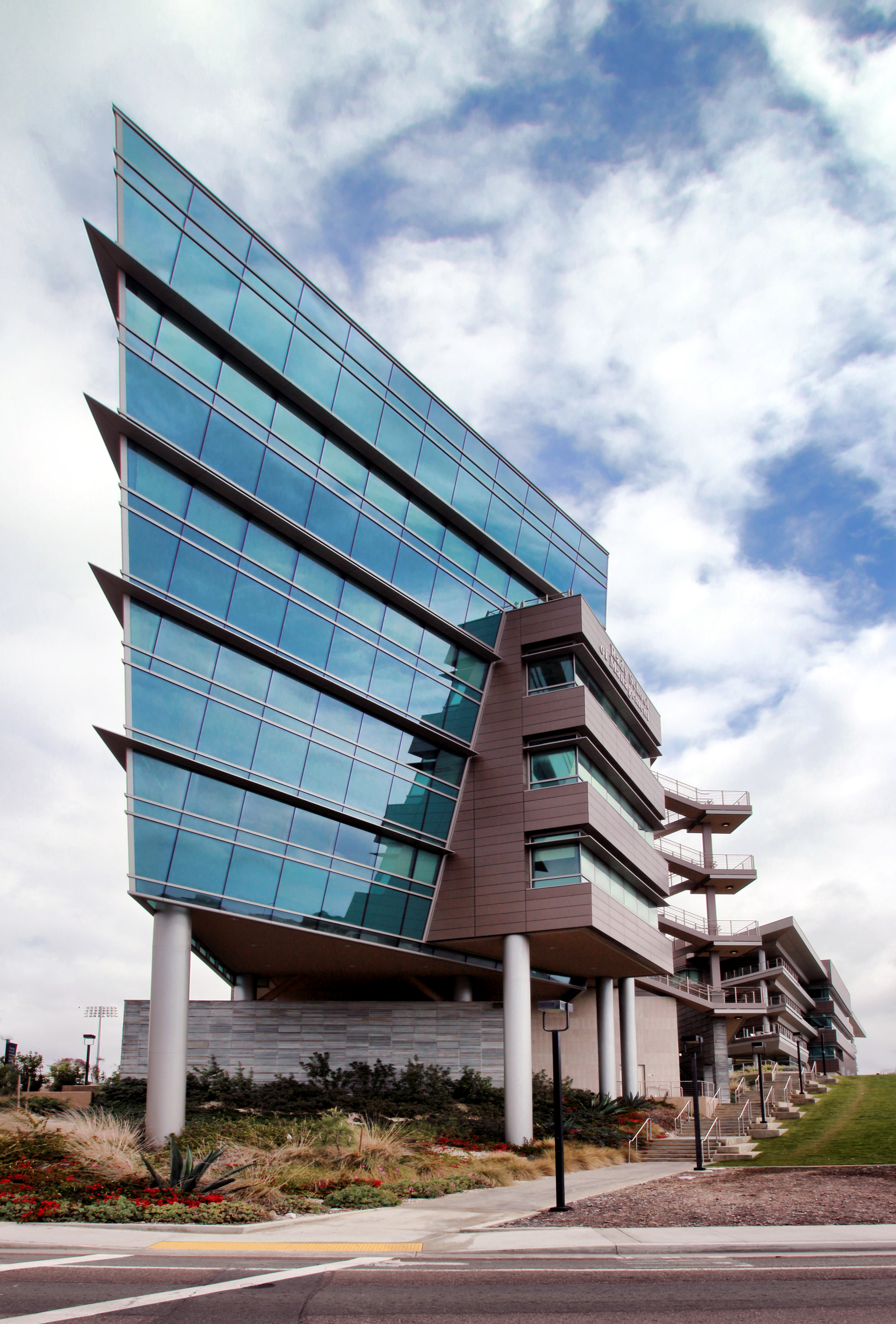
Wells Fargo Hall at the Rady School

The school began construction in 2010 on a new 81,000 square foot building, Wells Fargo Hall, which was completed in May 2012. The five-story structure, which was designed by Charles Luckman & Associates connects with Otterson Hall and features large capacity classrooms, conference rooms, a behavioral lab and the 295-seat J.R. Beyster Auditorium. Wells Fargo Hall also features an outdoor space adjacent to the J.R. Beyster Auditorium named Sullivan Square, in honor of the school's founding dean Robert S. Sullivan. Wells Fargo Hall is LEED Gold certified.

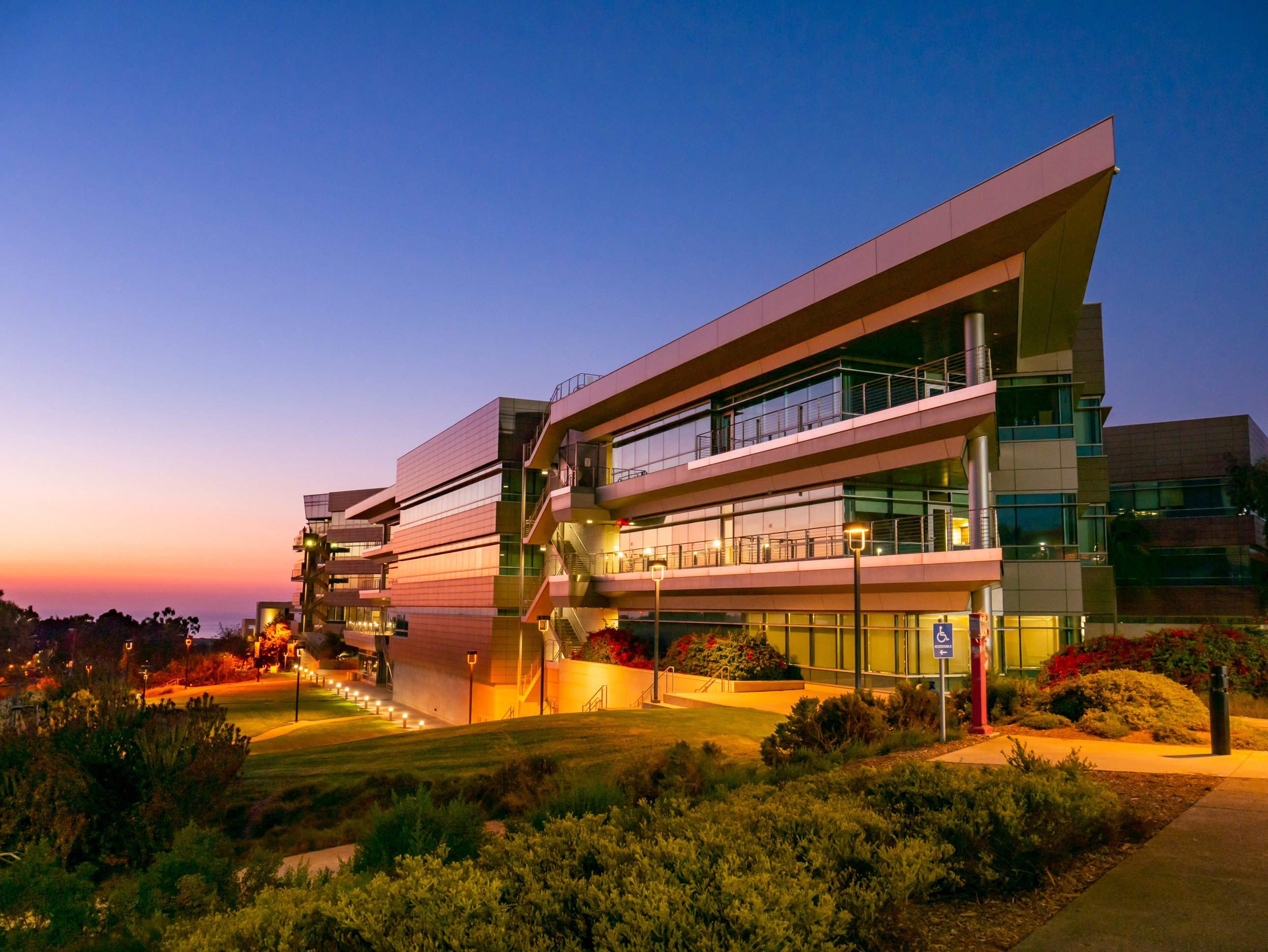
Rady School of Management at blue hour
