= Global Sensitivity Analysis. The Primer =

Book published in 2007

- Authors: Andrea Saltelli, Marco Ratto, Terry Andres, Francesca Campolongo, Jessica Cariboni, Debora Gatelli, Michaela Saisana, Stefano Tarantola
- Language: English
- Subjects: Mathematical modelling Applied Statistics; Model validationImpact assessment Evidence-Based policy Model validation
- Publisher: John Wiley & Sons
- Publication date: 18 December 2007
- Pages: 304
- ISBN: 978-0-470-05997-5

Global Sensitivity Analysis. The Primer by Andrea Saltelli and other practitioners is an introduction to sensitivity analysis of model output, a discipline that studies how the uncertainty in model input and model assumptions propagates to model output and model-based inference. The volume was published in December 2007 by John Wiley & Sons. The same publisher offered a Chinese translation in 2018.

== Main ==
Sensitivity analysis applies to all forms of quantification and has been mostly used in relation to mathematical modelling. It is an ingredient of model validation it that it studies how the uncertainty in the input (data, assumptions) affects the output of the model (inferences, decisions). The volume appears as the most cited handbook of sensitivity analysis, and tackles questions such as How sensitive are results to an assumed input value?; What variables are driving conclusions?; Can I simplify this model?; What parameter levels will lead to a desired outcome? Exercises and solutions are provided at the end of each chapter. A table of content is offered by statistician Shuangzhe Liu in his review of the book:

Table of content
Chapter	Title	Content
1.	Introduction to sensitivity analysis	A philosophical introduction to models. How to read the book.
2.	Experimental design	Can methods of statistical Design of experiments be applied to mathematical modelling?
3.	Elementary effects method	The Morris method and its variants
4.	Variance-based methods	Methods based on decomposing the variance of the output
5.	Factor mapping and metamodeling (with Peter Young)	An introduction to metamodeling and Monte Carlo filtering
6.	Sensitivity analysis: From theory to practice	More applications of sensitivity analysis with policy example

The volume reads as a compilation of the authors' and other practitioners' previous works aimed to a simulation-based sensitivity analysis that is efficient and carefully designed. Among the authors cited in the book is statistician Edward E. Leamer who introduced the term ">Global sensitivity analysis". The first chapter offers a sort of philosophical introduction to discipline followed by an anticipation of the methods that will be treated in Chapters 3,4,5. The second chapter treats experimental design, an important topic since simulation work may be computer time intensive and a well-designed experiment are useful. This chapter introduces to several designs including Latin hypercube sampling and Quasi random sampling with Low-discrepancy Sequences, Sobol sequence specifically. Chapter 3 deals with the method of elementary effects, a derivative based approach that changes the value of a single factor then repeats this at several points in the space of the input, also illustrating how to proceed to treat factors in groups. The method is due to statistician Max D. Morris. Chapter 4 deals with the variance-based methods that are the authors' recommended best practice. These permit to compute the first order effect of a factor as a contribution to the variance of the output, its interaction terms, as well as a total effect. Chapter 5 presents Monte Carlo filtering and Metamodeling. Three worked example are presented in chapter 6 using different methods and discussing when to use what. An afterword concludes the volume with a discussion of possible mode use and misuse, and the problems of model validation. Thus, the volume tackles theory and practice of sensitivity analysis, offering motivation for the analysis, reviewing required statistical concepts, and providing a guide to potential applications in several chapters, see the examples in chapter 6.

== Reception ==
According to Bryan E. Shepherd the book is to be praised for clarity of exposition, wealth of examples, and solved exercises, while a limitation is that it appears written more for mathematical modelling and simulation than for statistical modelling, though another reviewer finds the book instructive for statistical models as well. The application of this primer to different kind of models is attested by the tens of thousands of citations in academic articles. The book is seen as a "welcome addition to its sister volume" Sensitivity Analysis in Practice: A Guide to Assessing Scientific Models, reviewed in, see citations.
