= GIFMod =

Stormwater modeling software

GIFMod (Green Infrastructure Flexible Model) is a free, open-source computer program for simulating the hydraulic and water quality performance of green infrastructure and other stormwater management practices. Developed at the Catholic University of America in collaboration with the United States Environmental Protection Agency (EPA), GIFMod is included in the EPA's Green Infrastructure Modeling Toolkit.

== Overview ==
GIFMod enables users to construct models of various low-impact development (LID) practices, including bioretention systems, permeable pavement, infiltration basins, constructed wetlands, green roofs, and wet ponds. The software uses a block-and-connector architecture in which spatial features such as surface water ponds, soil layers, and drainage pipes are represented as "blocks," while the interfaces between them are represented as "connectors."

The hydraulic module solves a combination of the Richards equation, kinematic and diffusive wave equations, Darcy's law, and other user-provided flow models. GIFMod also includes modules for particle transport and reactive transport of water quality constituents, allowing users to simulate processes such as sorption, sedimentation, filtration, and user-defined biochemical transformations.

GIFMod includes both deterministic and probabilistic inverse modeling capabilities for parameter estimation. The deterministic approach uses a genetic algorithm, while the stochastic approach employs Bayesian inference through Markov chain Monte Carlo methods.

== Development ==
GIFMod was developed by researchers at the Catholic University of America and the EPA's National Risk Management Research Laboratory. The foundational paper describing the framework was published in Environmental Modelling & Software in 2017. The software is written in C++ and is available as both a console application and a graphical user interface version.

The source code is hosted on GitHub under the EPA's organizational account.

== Reception and use in research ==
An independent review of bioretention modeling tools published in Environmental Modelling & Software identified GIFMod and HYDRUS as the only two models that use the Richards equation for determining infiltration under variably saturated conditions, noting this as an advantage over tools that rely on simpler approximations.

A review in WIREs Water on the catchment-scale effects of green infrastructure listed GIFMod among several modeling tools used to quantify the local and sewershed-level effects of low-impact development practices in urban settings.

Researchers at the University of Hong Kong used GIFMod to model stepped bioretention cells for slopes, concluding that the software was well suited for simulating systems with multiple cells and complex pipe configurations.

A subsequent review in the Journal of Hydrology compared bioretention modeling approaches and discussed GIFMod's calibration performance, noting Nash-Sutcliffe efficiency values ranging from 0.68 to 0.86 for log-transformed hydrographs in field applications, while also observing limitations in its representation of underdrain and internal water storage configurations.

An independent study on nitrogen removal in bioretention basins noted that GIFMod was among the few available tools capable of process-based water quality modeling for green infrastructure, in contrast to widely used models that rely on approximate representations of biochemical processes.

The Mid-Atlantic Regional Integrated Sciences and Assessments (MARISA) program, supported by the National Oceanic and Atmospheric Administration, lists GIFMod as a water modeling tool in its data tools inventory.

The National Fish and Wildlife Foundation has also listed GIFMod as a resource for pollution prevention calculations in green infrastructure planning.

The Sustainable Infrastructure Tools Navigator, an independent resource for infrastructure planning, lists GIFMod as a tool for evaluating urban stormwater and green infrastructure performance.

== See also ==
- Storm Water Management Model (SWMM)
- Green infrastructure
- Bioretention
- Richards equation
- Environmental modeling
