= Forking paths problem =

Fallacy in statistical hypothesis testing

The garden of forking paths is a problem in frequentist hypothesis testing through which researchers can unintentionally produce false positives for a tested hypothesis through leaving themselves too many degrees of freedom. In contrast to fishing expeditions such as data dredging where only expected or apparently-significant results are published, this allows for a similar effect even when only one experiment is run, through a series of choices about how to implement methods and analyses, which are themselves informed by the data as it is observed and processed.

== History ==
Exploring a forking decision-tree while analyzing data was at one point grouped with the multiple comparisons problem as an example of poor statistical method. However Gelman and Loken demonstrated that this can happen implicitly by researchers aware of best practices who only make a single comparison and only evaluate their data once.

The fallacy is believing an analysis to be free of multiple comparisons despite having had enough degrees of freedom in choosing the method, after seeing some or all of the data, to produce similarly-grounded false positives. Degrees of freedom can include choosing among main effects or interactions, methods for data exclusion, whether to combine different studies, and method of data analysis.

== Multiverse analysis ==
A multiverse analysis is an approach that acknowledges the multitude of analytical paths available when analyzing data. The concept is inspired by the metaphorical "garden of forking paths," which represents the multitude of potential analyses that could be conducted on a single dataset. In a multiverse analysis, researchers systematically vary their analytical choices to explore a range of possible outcomes from the same raw data. This involves altering variables such as data inclusion/exclusion criteria, variable transformations, outlier handling, statistical models, and hypothesis tests to generate a spectrum of results that could have been obtained given different analytic decisions.

The key benefits of a multiverse analysis include.

- Transparency. It makes the analytical process more transparent by openly discussing the impact of different analytic choices on the results.
- Robustness. By examining how conclusions vary across a range of analytical scenarios, researchers can assess the robustness of their findings. If a conclusion holds across many plausible analyses, it is considered more robust and less likely to be a product of arbitrary decision-making.
- Identifying Consequential Decisions. It helps identify which analytical decisions most strongly influence the outcomes, guiding researchers towards more informed methodological choices in future studies.

This approach is valuable in fields where research findings are sensitive to the methods of data analysis, such as psychology, neuroscience, economics, and social sciences. Multiverse analysis aims to mitigate issues related to reproducibility and replicability by revealing how different analytical choices can lead to different conclusions from the same dataset. Thus, it encourages a more nuanced understanding of data analysis, promoting integrity and credibility in scientific research.

Concepts that are closely related to multiverse analysis are specification-curve analysis and the assessment of vibration of effects.

== See also ==
- Statistical hypothesis testing
- Researcher degrees of freedom
