= Mixed Signals: Preprocessing Psychophysiological Data in Brain Vision Analyzer =

Psychophysiology manual

Mixed Signals: Preprocessing Psychophysiological Data in Brain Vision Analyzer is a psychophysiology manual for experimental psychologists. Originally compiled by Paul Pfaff at the Experimental Psychopathology and Clinical Psychology lab at Utrecht University, the updated edition of the manual was printed in 2025.

The manual covers the preprocessing of a wide range of psychophysiological data types common in experimental psychology. Specific sections are dedicated to skin conductance response, facial electromyography (EMG), startle EMG, smiling/frowning EMG, and postural sway. Preprocessing steps outlined include baseline correction, filtering, artifact rejection, and signal standardization. Recommendations are provided based on reviews of the latest literature in the field.

The publication is part of ongoing open science initiatives in psychology to standardize research procedures in the aftermath of the replication crisis and has received positive reviews.
