= High-dimensional model representation =

High-dimensional model representation is a finite expansion for a given multivariable function. The expansion was first described by Ilya M. Sobol in his paper "Sensitivity Estimates for Nonlinear Mathematical Models" as

$$f(\mathbf{x}) = f_0+
\sum_{i=1}^nf_i(x_i)+
\sum_{i,j=1 \atop i<j}^n
f_{ij}(x_{i},x_{j})+ \cdots +
f_{12\ldots n}(x_1,\ldots,x_n).$$

The method, used to determine the right hand side functions, is given in Sobol's paper. A review can be found here: High Dimensional Model Representation (HDMR): Concepts and Applications.

The underlying logic behind the HDMR is to express all variable interactions in a system in a hierarchical order. For instance $f_0$ represents the mean response of the model $f$. It can be considered as measuring what is left from the model after stripping down all variable effects. The uni-variate functions $f_i(x_i)$, however represents the "individual" contributions of the variables. For instance, $f_1(x_1)$ is the portion of the model that can be controlled only by the variable $x_1$. For this reason, $f_1(x_1)$ cannot contain constant terms, because constant terms are expressed in $f_0$. Going further into higher interactions, the next stop is bivariate functions $f_{ij}(x_i,x_j)$ which represents the cooperative effect of variables $x_i$ and $x_j$ together. Similar logic applies here: the bivariate functions do not contain univarite functions nor constants as it violates the construction logic of HDMR. As we go into higher interactions, the number of interactions are increasing and at last we reach the residual term $f_{12n}(x_1,\ldots,x_n)$ representing the contribution only if all variable act together.

== HDMR as an Approximation ==
The hierarchical representation model of HDMR brings an advantage if one needs to replace an existing model with a simpler one usually containing only univariate or bivariate terms. If the target model does not contain higher level of variable interactions, this approach can yield good approximations with the additional advantage of providing a clearer view of variable interactions.

== See also ==
- Variance-based sensitivity analysis
- Volterra series
