= Applications of sensitivity analysis to environmental sciences =

Sensitivity analysis studies the relationship between the output of a model and its input variables or assumptions. Historically, the need for a role of sensitivity analysis in modelling, and many applications of sensitivity analysis have originated from environmental science and ecology.

== Early works ==
Hydrology and water quality are two modelling fields where sensitivity analysis was applied quite early. Relevant examples are the work of Bruce Beck, George M. Hornberger, Keith Beven and Robert C. Spear.

== Other applications ==
More recent applications encompass snow avalanche models, land depletion, marine biogeochemical modelling, irrigation and again hydrological modelling.

== Methods ==
Several methods related sensitivity analysis have been developed in the context of environmental applications, such as Data Based Mechanistic Model due to Peter Young and VARS due to S. Razavi and H. V.Gupta.

== Prevalence across disciplines ==
In a 2019 work on the take-up of sensitivity analysis in different disciplines, among 19 different subject areas, environmental sciences were found to have the highest number of papers, which become even higher if the papers in earth sciences are included.

== Journals ==
Reference journals for applications of sensitivity analysis in environmental science are Environmental Modelling & Software, Water Resources Research, Water Research, Ecological indicators and others.

== Checklists ==
Sensitivity analysis is part of recent checklists or guidelines for environmental modelling.

== Forthcoming special issues ==
A Special Issue on Sensitivity analysis for environmental modelling in preparation.
