= Applications of sensitivity analysis to business =

Sensitivity analysis can be usefully applied to business problem, allowing the identification of those variables which may influence a business decision, such as e.g. an investment.

In a decision problem, the analyst may want to identify cost drivers as well as other quantities for which we need to acquire better knowledge to make an informed decision. On the other hand, some quantities have no influence on the predictions, so that we can save resources at no loss in accuracy by relaxing some of the conditions. See Corporate finance § Sensitivity and scenario analysis. Additionally to the general motivations listed above, sensitivity analysis can help in a variety of other circumstances specific to business:

- To identify critical assumptions or compare alternative model structures
- To guide future data collections
- To optimize the tolerance of manufactured parts in terms of the uncertainty in the parameters
- To optimize resources allocation

However, there are also some problems associated with sensitivity analysis in the business context:

- Variables are often interdependent (correlated), which makes examining each variable individually unrealistic. E.G. changing one factor such as sales volume, will most likely affect other factors such as the selling price.
- Often the assumptions upon which the analysis is based are made by using past experience/data which may not hold in the future.
- Assigning a maximum and minimum (or optimistic and pessimistic) value is open to subjective interpretation. For instance, one person's 'optimistic' forecast may be more conservative than that of another person performing a different part of the analysis. This sort of subjectivity can adversely affect the accuracy and overall objectivity of the analysis.
