= Applications of sensitivity analysis in epidemiology =

Sensitivity analysis studies the relation between the uncertainty in a model-based inference and the uncertainties in the model assumptions. Sensitivity analysis can play an important role in epidemiology, for example in assessing the influence of the unmeasured confounding on the causal conclusions of a study. It is also important in all mathematical modelling studies of epidemics.

Sensitivity analysis can be used in epidemiology, for example in assessing the influence of the unmeasured confounding on the causal conclusions of a study. The use of sensitivity analysis in mathematical modelling of infectious disease is suggested in on the Coronavirus disease 2019 outbreak. Given the significant uncertainty at play, the use of sensitivity analysis to apportion the output uncertainty into input parameters is crucial in the context of Decision-making. Examples of applications of sensitivity analysis to modelling of COVID-19 are and. in particular, the time of intervention in containing the pandemic spread is identified as a key parameter.
