= Ronald L. Iman =

American mathematician

Ronald L. Iman is an American statistician. He was one of the developers of the statistical technique known as Latin hypercube sampling.

In 1991 Iman was awarded the American Statistical Association's Founders Award. He was president of the American Statistical Association in 1994.

== Books ==
- A Data-Based Approach to Statistics (1994)
- A Data-Based Approach to Statistics: Concise Version (1995)
- Modern Business Statistics with W. J. Conover, 2e (1989)
- Modern Business Statistics with W. J. Conover, (1983)
- Introduction to Modern Business Statistics with W. J. Conover, (1983)
- A Modern Approach to Statistics with W. J. Conover, (1983)
