= Ilya M. Sobol' =

Russian mathematician (1926–2025)

Ilya Sobol'
- Илья Соболь
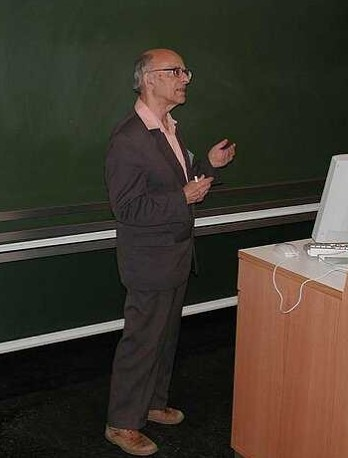
- Sobol' in 2001
- Born: Ilya Meyerovich Sobol'; 15 August 1926; Panevėžys, Lithuania
- Died: 9 December 2025 (aged 99); Moscow, Russia
- Known for: Sobol' sequence; Sensitivity analysis; Optimization; Astrophysics
- Awards: USSR Medal for Labour Valour and the Order of the Honour Badge
- Scientific career
- Fields: Mathematics

Ilya Meyerovich Sobol' (Russian: Илья Меерович Соболь; 15 August 1926 – 9 December 2025) was a Russian mathematician, known for his work on Monte Carlo methods. His research spanned several applications, from nuclear studies to astrophysics, and has contributed significantly to the field of sensitivity analysis.

== Life and career ==
Ilya Meyerovich Sobol' was born on 15 August 1926, in Panevėžys, Lithuania. When World War II reached Lithuania, his family was evacuated to Izhevsk. Here Sobol' attended high school which he finished in 1943 with distinction. Sobol' then moved to Moscow at the Faculty of Mechanics and Mathematics of Moscow State University, where he graduated with distinction in 1948. Ilya Meyerovich Sobol' recognized Aleksandr Khinchin, Viktor Vladimirovich Nemytskii, and A. Kolmogorov as his teachers.

In 1949, Sobol' joined a laboratory of the Geophysical Complex Expedition at the Institute of Geophysics of the USSR Academy of Sciences led by Andrey Nikolayevich Tikhonov. This laboratory was subsequently merged with the Institute of Applied Mathematics of the USSR Academy of Sciences.

Sobol' was for many years professor at the Department of Mathematical Physics of the Moscow Engineering Physics Institute, and was an active contributor to the Journal of Computational Mathematics and Mathematical Physics.

Sobol' died in Moscow on 9 December 2025, at the age of 99.

== Contribution ==
Sobol contributed to the scientific literature with about one hundred and seventy scientific papers and several textbooks.

In his student years, Sobol' was actively engaged in solving various mathematical problems. His first scientific works concerning ordinary differential equations were published in renowned mathematical journals in 1948. Some of his subsequent studies were also devoted to this subject. During his years at the Institute of Applied Mathematics Sobol, he took part in the computations for the first Soviet atomic and hydrogen bombs. He also worked with Alexander Samarskii on the computation of temperature waves.

In 1958, Sobol' started to work on pseudo-random numbers, then to move on developing new approaches which were later called quasi-Monte Carlo methods (QMC). He was the first to use the Haar functions in mathematical applications. Sobol' defended his D.Sc. dissertation "The Method of Haar Series in the Theory of Quadrature Formulas" in 1972. The results were previously published in his well-known monograph "Multidimensional Quadrature Formulas and Haar Functions".

Sobol' applied Monte Carlo methods in various scientific fields, including astrophysics. He was actively working with a prominent physicist Rashid Sunyaev on Monte-Carlo calculations of X-ray source spectra which led to discovery of the Sunyaev-Zel'dovich effect, which is due to electrons associated with gas in galaxy clusters scattering the cosmic microwave background radiation.

He was especially known for developing a new quasi-random number sequence known as LPτ sequence, or Sobol' sequences. These are now known as digital (t,s)-sequences in base 2, and they can be used to construct digital (t,m,s)-nets. Sobol' demonstrated that these sequences are superior to many existing competing methods (see a review in Bratley and Fox, 1988 ). For this reason Sobol' sequences are widely used in many fields, including finance, for the evaluation of integrals, optimization, experimental design, sensitivity analysis and finance . The key property of Sobol' sequences is that they provide greatly accelerated convergence rate in Monte Carlo integration when compared with what can be obtained using pseudo-random numbers. His achievements in astrophysics include application of Monte Carlo methods to the mathematical simulation of X-ray and gamma spectra of compact relativistic objects. He studied particle transmission (neutrons, photons). His contributions to sensitivity analysis include the development of the variance-based sensitivity indices which bear his name (Sobol' indices ) and Derivative-based Global Sensitivity Measures (DGSM).

Sobol', together with R. Statnikov, proposed a new approach to the problems of multi-objective optimization and multi-objective decision making. This approach allows researchers and practitioners to solve the problems with non-differentiable objective functions and non-linear constraints. These results are described in their monograph. His book, Monte Carlo Methods, originally published in Russian in 1968, had a US version in 1994. He also contributed to the first multi-author book on sensitivity analysis.

== Legacy ==
Sobol's work is cited in textbooks of uncertainty quantification, Financial Engineering, quasi-Monte Carlo methods. His work on sensitivity analysis has been an inspiration for many different scholars.
