= Environmental Modelling & Software =

- Discipline: Environmental science, environmental modelling, software
- Language: English
- Edited by: Daniel P. Ames

Publication details
- Former name: Environmental Software
- History: 1997-present
- Publisher: Elsevier
- Frequency: Monthly
- Open access: Hybrid
- Impact factor: 4.807 (2019)

Standard abbreviations
- ISO 4: Environ. Model. Softw.

Indexing
- ISSN: 1364-8152

Links
- Journal homepage; ScienceDirect

Environmental Modelling & Software is a peer-reviewed academic journal of environmental modelling.

== Editors-in-chief ==
- 1998–2016, Anthony Jakeman, Australian National University
- 2016–present, Daniel P. Ames, Brigham Young University
