= Environmental modelling =

Environmental modelling is the creation and use of mathematical models of the environment. Environmental modelling may be used purely for research purposes, and improved understanding of environmental systems, or for providing an interdisciplinary analysis that can inform decision making and policy.

Environmental Modelling is applied to deal with environmental issues. Based on the systems approach, using computer hard- and software, they intend to represent real-world developments, mainly related to biogeochemistry, ecology, and hydrology.

The range of problems for which modelling is applied is as diverse as environmental problems are. There are models for air, water, and soil quality. They concern the biogeochemistry of the atmosphere, lakes, rivers, swamps, marine systems, aquifers, etc. Ecosystems are a topic as well, dealing with the fate and interaction of species in aqueous, terrestrial, and aerial compartments as a response to changes in the conditions that they live in.

The aim of computer modelling is diverse. It can be used for prognosis of future development, based on present and past observations. Scenario modelling examines the reaction of a system to interventions, mainly caused by human activity. Less ambitiously, a model may aim just to increase the understanding of a segment of the environment.

Environmental models deal with the representation of processes that occur in the real world in space and time. They adopt simulation techniques that are applied mainly in mathematical physics. These techniques have been applied and developed in natural sciences for a large variety of issues. Thus, they include methodologies from various fields, prominently from biogeochemistry, ecology, and hydrology. In environmental modeling these methods are applied to environmental problems.

Dynamic models based on systems of ordinary differential equations are primarily used to describe the processes that change the environment over time. Partial differential equations are used to handle developments in space. In mathematical terms this is about numerics. Numerical modeling deals with using computational methods to find solutions of differential equations.

With the advance of geographic information systems (GIS) spatial interactions are managed by data models. These models are classified as data-driven in contrast to the process-driven approach described before. Real objects can be linked to point, line, and area features, representing, for example: buildings, roads, shorelines, railways, and monitoring networks. GIS is used to supply input variables needed by simulation models as well as to produce post-processing tasks like output data visualization and analysis.

The model operations and GIS may be separated with data exchange via file transfer (loosely coupling) or may be coupled by a software linkage that arranges for data exchange. The direct integration of numerical simulations into the GIS model (tight coupling) usually requires additional implementation.

== See also ==
- Environmental niche modelling
- Environmental informatics
- Ecosystem model
